= Straits View =

- Planning Area

Other transcription(s)
  - Chinese: 海峡景
  - Pinyin: Hǎixiá jǐng
  - Malay: Pemandangan Selat
  - Tamil: ஸ்ட்ரெய்ட்ஸ் காண்க
- Location in Central Region

- Location within Singapore
- Coordinates: 1.2787°N 103.8506°E
- Country: Singapore
- Region: Central

Government
  - Mayors: ----

Area
  - Total: 1.13 km^{2} (0.44 sq mi)
  - Rank: 52 out of 55

Population (2026)
  - Total: 0
  - Density: 0.0/km^{2} (0.0/sq mi)

Ethnic groups

Straits View is a planning area located in the Central Area of the Central Region of Singapore. The area is currently relatively undeveloped, with fewer commercial developments compared to the adjacent Downtown Core.

Straits View planning area is bounded by Marina South to the north, the Downtown Core to the northwest and west, and the Singapore Strait to the south.

== History ==
Straits View, along with adjacent planning areas, were created in the 1980s as part of the 660-hectare 'Marina City' land reclamation project undertaken by the government to expand the Central Business District. While its adjacent areas have been considerably developed, Straits View remains relatively undeveloped and no long term plans have been announced by the government as of yet besides existing developments.

In 2006, the Marina South Pier opened, which was built to replace the former Clifford Pier at Collyer Quay. The pier provides ferry services to Southern Islands such as Kusu Island and Saint John's Island.

In 2012, the Marina Bay Cruise Centre opened, located about 500 metres from the Marina South Pier.

== Transportation ==
The first Mass Rapid Transit station to open in Straits View is Marina South Pier station on the North South line, which started operations in 2014 as part of the NSL extension. Marina South Pier station replaced Marina Bay station as the southern terminus of the NSL. The station serves the namesake Marina South Pier as well as the adjacent cruise centre. Marina South MRT station on the Thomson-East Coast line was initially scheduled to open alongside other TEL3 stations, but it currently remains non-operational due to the lack of developments in Straits View but will open in tandem with future developments in the area.

Owing to the lack of developments, Straits View is served by a single bus service, 400, operated by SBS Transit. Service 400 provides connections between Marina South Pier or Marina Bay Cruise Centre with nearby MRT stations such as Gardens by the Bay (forward direction only), Downtown, Shenton Way (return direction only) and Tanjong Pagar.
