= Marina East =

- Planning Area

Other transcription(s)
  - Chinese: 滨海东
  - Pinyin: Bīnhǎi dōng
  - Malay: Marina Timur
  - Tamil: மரினா கிழக்கு
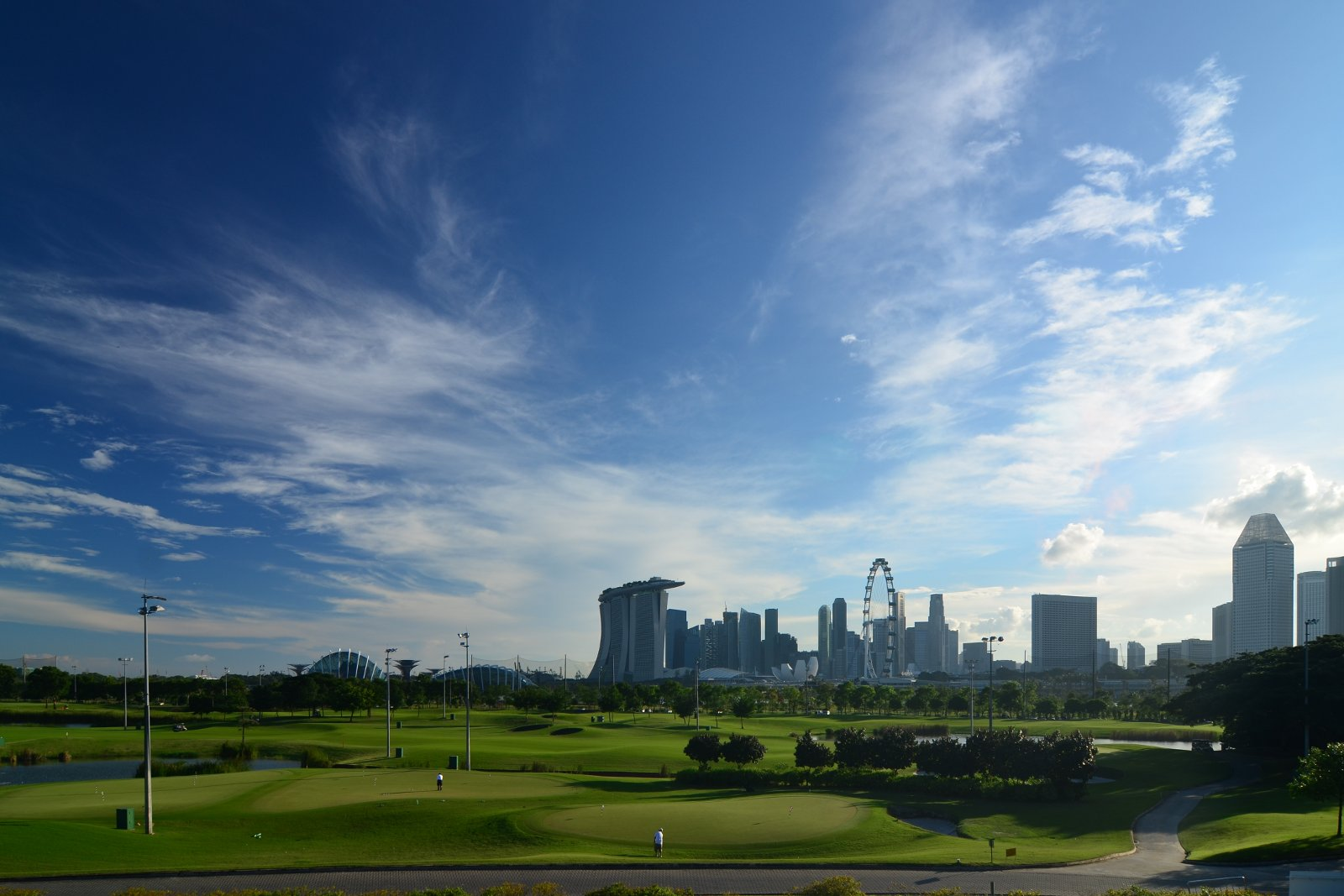
- Marina Bay Golf Course at Marina East

- Location on Central Region
- Coordinates: 1.288°N 103.873°E
- Country: Singapore
- Region: Central

Government
  - Mayors: ----

Area
  - Total: 1.84 km^{2} (0.71 sq mi)
  - Rank: 47th

Population (2026)
  - Total: 0
  - Density: 0.0/km^{2} (0.0/sq mi)

Ethnic groups

Marina East is a planning area located in the Central Area of the Central Region of Singapore, covering 140 hectares (350 acres) of reclaimed land.

It is the location of NTUC Club's Marina Bay Golf Course (formerly known as the Marina East Course) and the Gardens by the Bay (Bay East Garden).

Marina East is bordered by Marine Parade to the east, Kallang to the north, Marina South and Downtown Core to the west, as well as the Singapore Straits to the south. Marina East Planning Area should not be confused with the Marina East subzone that is part of the adjacent Marine Parade Planning Area.

Marina East was formed in 1979 as part of phase seven of the East Coast Land Reclamation Scheme, which involved reclaiming land from Tanjong Rhu. By 1978, the Urban Redevelopment Authority (URA) began selling 295 hectares (730 acres) of land in Marina East as part of Marina City, a 660 hectares (1,600 acres) reclaimed site consisting of Marina East, Marina Centre, and Marina South.
