= Singapore Cruise Centre =

Cruise terminal in Singapore

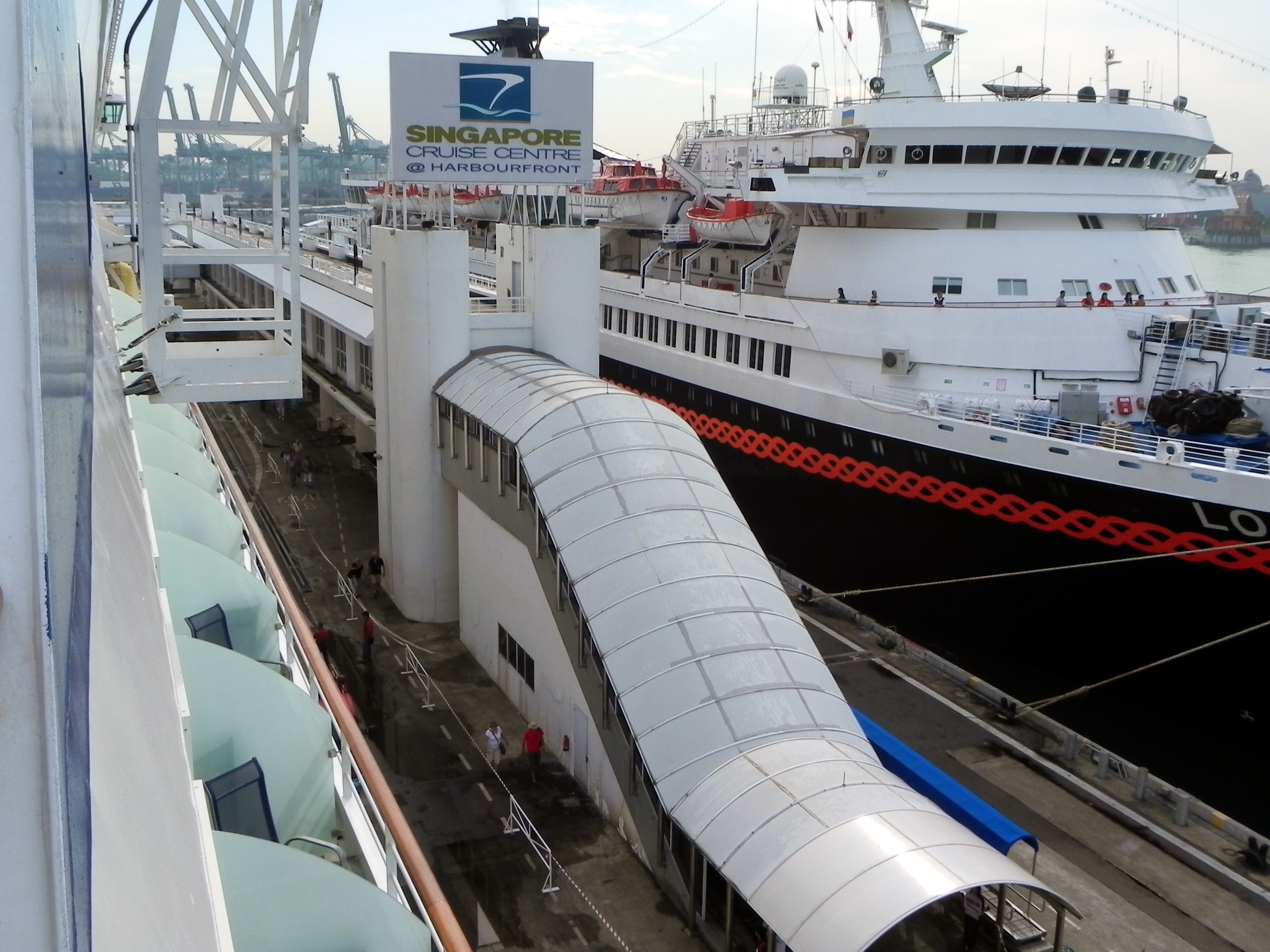

- Location within Singapore

General information
- Status: Operating
- Type: Cruise, Retail
- Location: 1 Maritime Square Singapore 099253
- Coordinates: 1°15′49″N 103°49′13″E
- Inaugurated: December 1991; 34 years ago
- Renovated: December 1998; 27 years ago
- Operator: Singapore Cruise Centre

Design and construction
- Developer: Port of Singapore Authority

Website
- https://singaporecruise.com.sg

Singapore Cruise Centre
- Simplified Chinese: 新加坡邮轮中心
- Traditional Chinese: 新加坡郵輪中心
Transcriptions
Standard Mandarin
- Hanyu Pinyin: Xīnjiāpō Yóulún Zhōngxīn

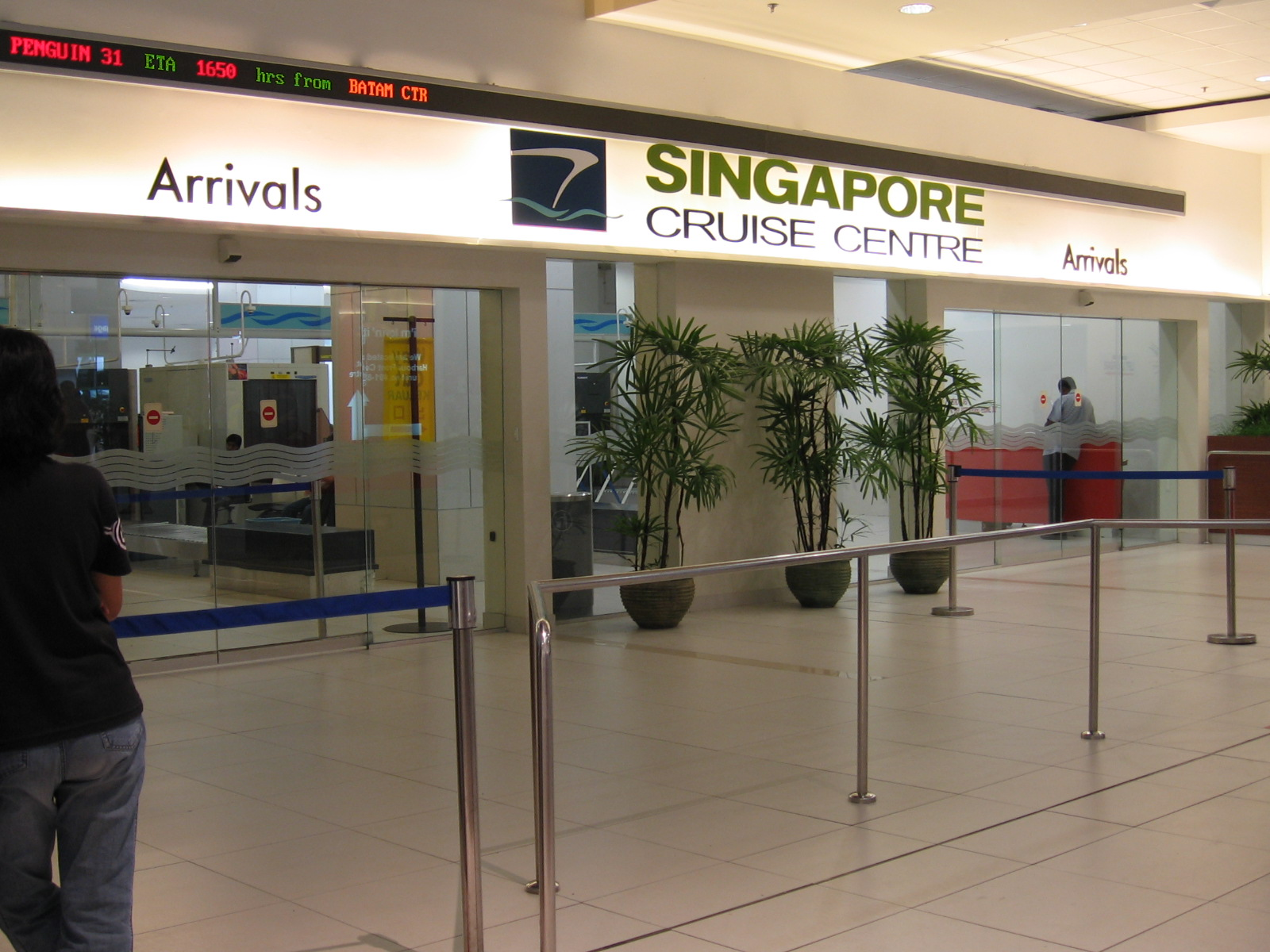
Arrival hall

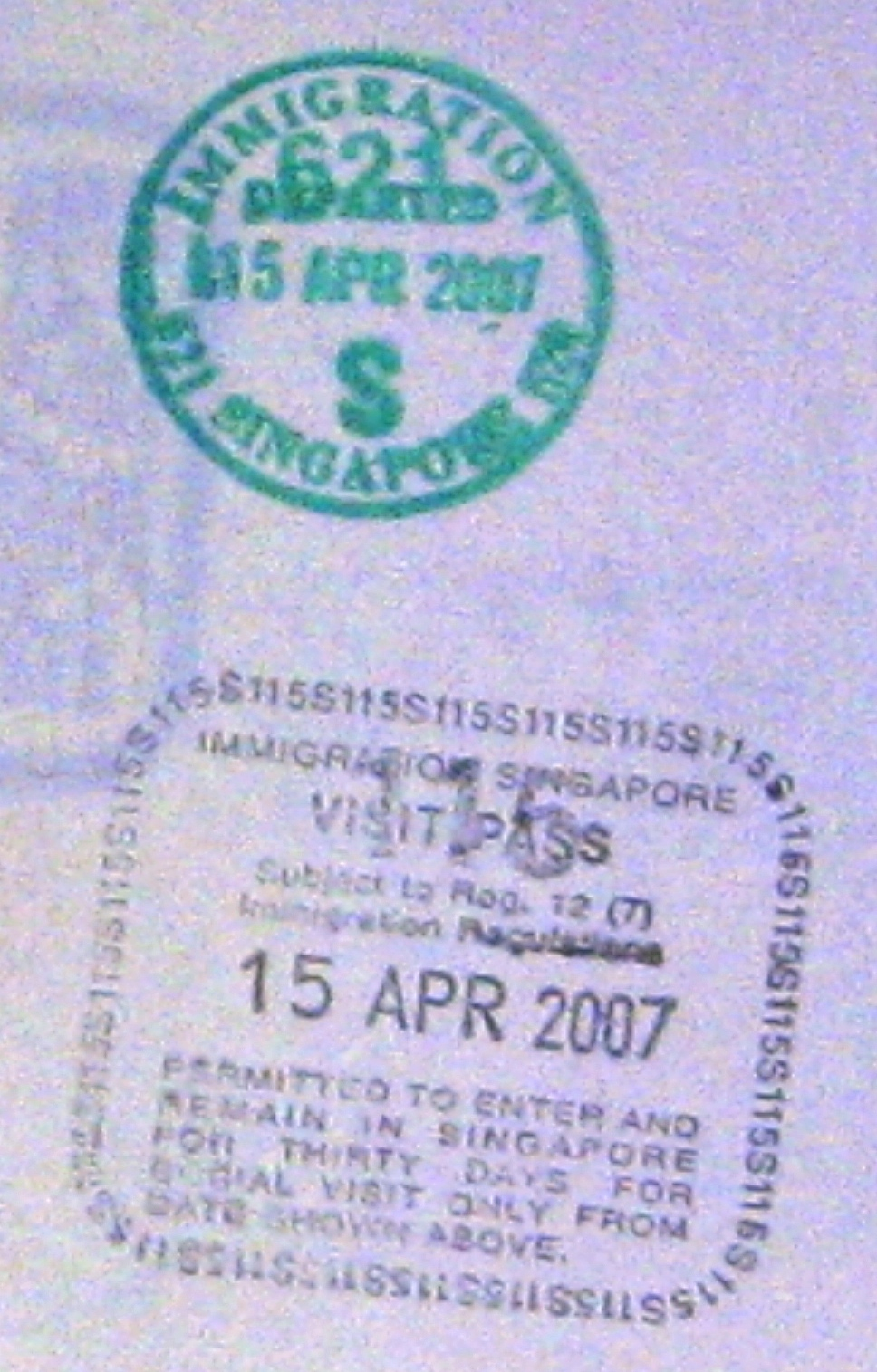
Discontinued passport stamps from the cruiseship centre and ferry terminal.

The Singapore Cruise Centre (abbrev: SCC; Chinese: 新加坡邮轮中心; Malay: Pusat Kapal Persiaran Singapura) is a cruise terminal located in the south of Singapore next to HarbourFront Centre in the vicinity of HarbourFront and in Keppel Harbour, near HarbourFront MRT station.

== History ==
SCC was built in 1991 by the Port of Singapore Authority (PSA). In 1998, it was upgraded at the cost of $23 million. It comprises two terminals, namely the International Passenger Terminal (IPT), and the Regional Ferry Terminal (RFT).

The Singapore Cruise Centre Pte Ltd, which is owned by PSA, took over management of the centre on 1 April 2003 when PSA Corporation divested its non-core businesses.

Additionally, SCC manages 2 other ferry terminals; Tanah Merah Ferry Terminal and Pasir Panjang Ferry Terminal. In total, SCC handles a throughput of over 7 million cruise and ferry passengers a year, of which about 950,000 are cruise passengers.

The existing terminals at HarbourFront were renovated in 2008 to optimize the use of available space. The entire level 2 is a restricted area, for the exclusive use of cruise and ferry passengers who have cleared immigration and security.

In 2013, SATS planned to buy over SCC for S$110 million. The acquisition plan was terminated in 2014.

In 2016, fully owned subsidiary SCC Travel Services Pte Ltd (STS) was formed to inspire travel to the destinations connected to its terminal network. STS is a B2C online travel agent retailing travel products from Bintan, Batam, Karimun and Singapore through its portal WOW Getaways.

SCC was later owned by Mapletree.

In 2023, Mapletree, the owner of SCC, was allowed by the Urban Redevelopment Authority to build an interim two-storey interim ferry and cruise terminal at HarbourFront, temporarily replacing the existing terminal at HarbourFront. The interim terminal was only to be used for a maximum of 10 years and to be demolished after it. The interim terminal was to be connected to the existing pier of the terminal and also to HarbourFront Tower One.

Construction of the interim terminal started in 2024 and was expected to finish by the end of 2025.

In 2024, it was announced that SCC would be closed and merged with the expanded Marina Bay Cruise Centre to free up space along the Greater Southern Waterfront.

== Facilities ==
The HarbourFront terminal has six berths, Tanah Merah has four berths and Pasir Panjang has four berths.

The IPT handles international cruise ships and also ferry rides between Singapore and the Indonesian islands of Batam and Karimun. The terminal has two berths of 310 and 270 meters (1,020 and 890 feet) with a height limit of 52 meters (171 feet). It has a draft of 12 meters (39 feet). It underwent an upgrade in 2005 to improve its passenger handling facilities.

== Awards ==
- Travel Weekly Asia - Best Cruise Port - 2016, 2017
