= Marina South MRT station =

Future Mass Rapid Transit station in Singapore

Marina South TE21 滨海南 மரினா சவுத்
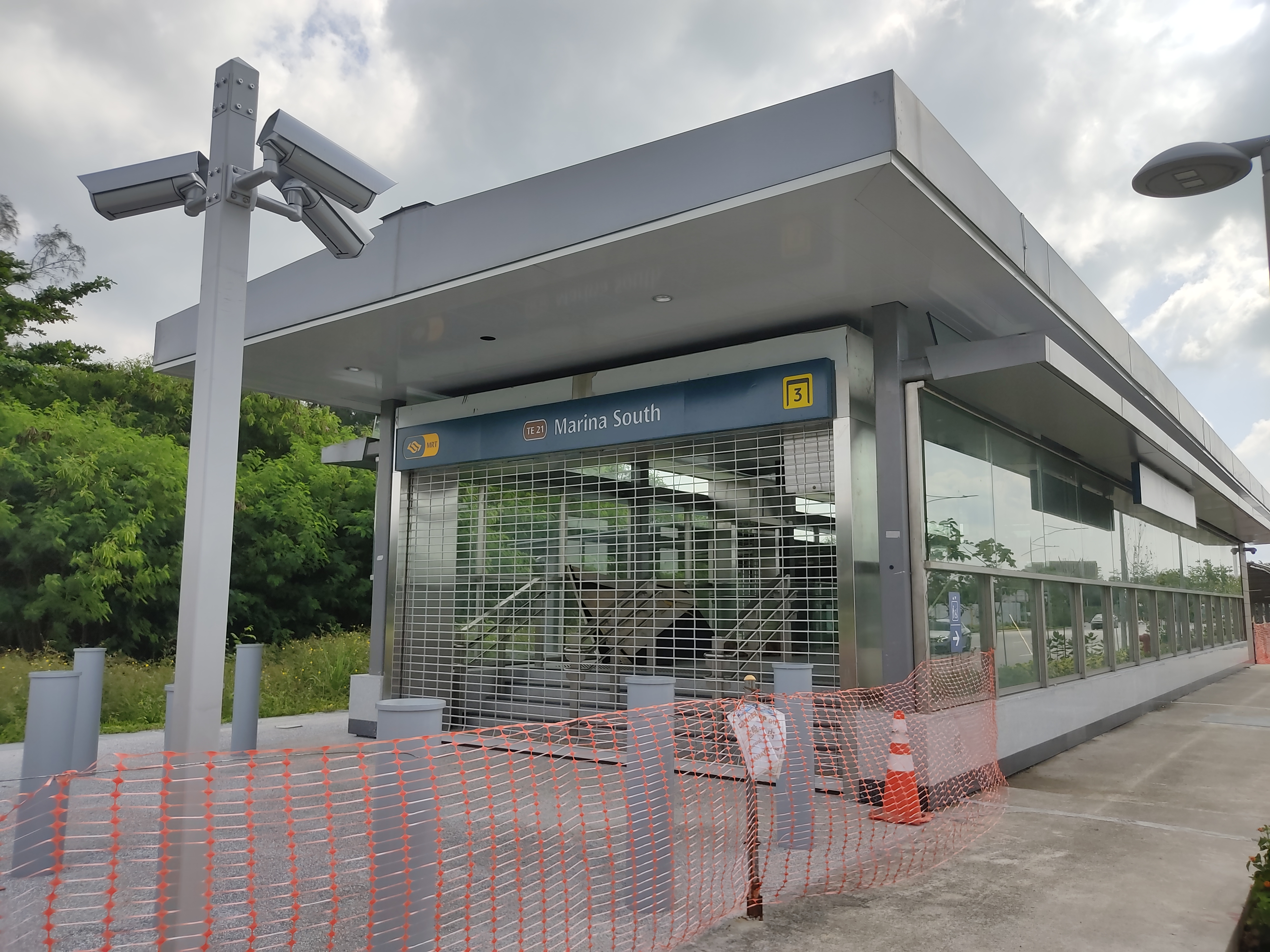
- TE21 Marina South MRT station, Exit 3

General information
- Location: 61 Marina Mall, Singapore 019397
- Coordinates: 01°16′26″N 103°51′47″E
- System: Future Mass Rapid Transit (MRT) station
- Owner: Land Transport Authority
- Operator: SMRT Trains
- Line: Thomson–East Coast Line
- Platforms: 2 (1 island platform)
- Tracks: 2

Construction
- Structure type: Underground
- Depth: 20 metres (66 ft)
- Platform levels: 1
- Accessible: Yes

Other information
- Station code: MRS

History
- Opening: TBA
- Former names: Marina Boulevard, Marina Coast

Services
Preceding station	Mass Rapid Transit	Following station
Marina Bay towards Woodlands North	Thomson–East Coast Line Future service	Gardens by the Bay towards Tanah Merah
Track layout
Location
- Location within Singapore Rail central area

Marina South MRT station is a non-operational underground Mass Rapid Transit station on the Thomson–East Coast Line. Situated in Straits View and Marina South, Singapore, it is located close to Marina South Pier. First announced in August 2012 as part of the Thomson Line (TSL), the station was constructed as part of TEL Phase 3 (TEL3) with the merger of the TSL and the Eastern Region Line (ERL).

Initially slated to open along with the rest of the TEL3 stations, it was announced in November 2021 that the station would only open when its surrounding areas were further developed, even though it had been structurally completed. Since operations for TEL3 began on 13 November 2022, trains have skipped this station and continued towards Gardens By The Bay or Marina Bay.

== History ==
Marina South station was first announced as part of the 22-station Thomson Line on 29 August 2012. In July 2014, the Land Transport Authority (LTA) awarded the contract for the design and construction of the station and associated tunnels to a joint venture between Sinohydro Corp and Sembcorp Design and Construction at S$488 million (US$385.1 million).

On 15 August 2014, the LTA further announced that the TSL would merge with the Eastern Region Line to form the Thomson–East Coast Line (TEL). Marina South station, part of the proposed line, would be constructed as part of TEL3, consisting of 13 stations between Mount Pleasant and Gardens by the Bay.

With restrictions imposed on construction due to the COVID-19 pandemic, the TEL3 completion date was pushed to 2022. On 23 November 2021, it was announced that the station's opening would be pushed to a later date until its surrounding areas were further developed.
