= Marina South Pier MRT station =

Mass Rapid Transit station in Singapore

Marina South Pier NS28 滨海南码头 மரினா சவுத் பியர்
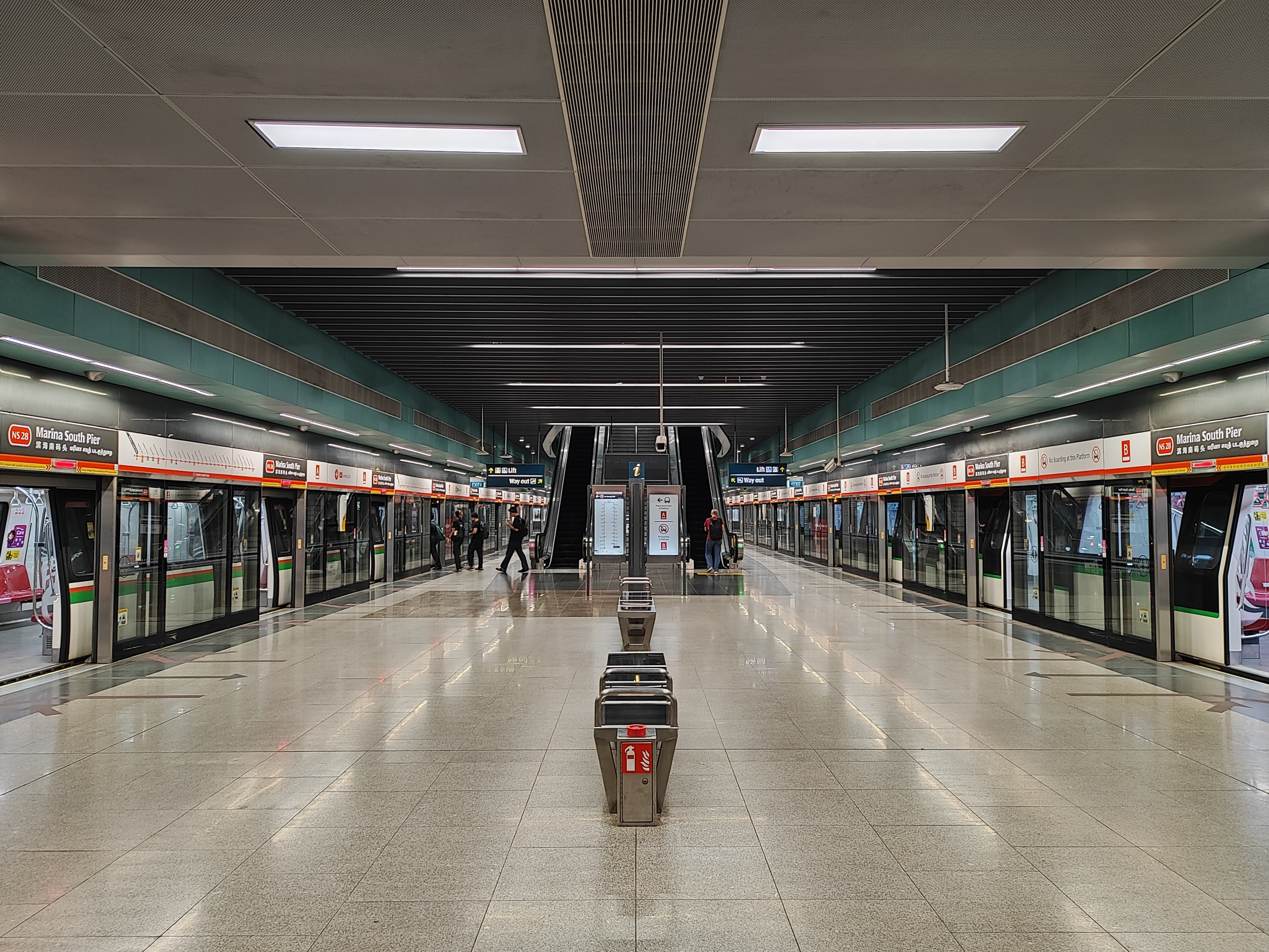
- Platform level of Marina South Pier MRT station

General information
- Location: 33 Marina Coastal Drive; Singapore 018948
- Coordinates: 01°16′15.4″N 103°51′47.7″E
- System: Mass Rapid Transit (MRT) terminus
- Operator: SMRT Trains Ltd (SMRT Corporation)
- Line: North–South Line
- Platforms: 2 (1 island platform)
- Tracks: 2
- Connections: Bus, taxi

Construction
- Structure type: Underground
- Platform levels: 1
- Parking: Yes (Marina South Pier)
- Cycle facilities: Yes
- Accessible: Yes

History
- Opened: 23 November 2014; 11 years ago
- Former names: Marina Pier

Passengers
- June 2024: 2,178 per day

Services
Preceding station	Mass Rapid Transit	Following station
Marina Bay towards Jurong East	North–South Line	Terminus
Track layout
Location
- Location within Singapore Rail central area

Marina South Pier MRT station is an underground Mass Rapid Transit (MRT) station in Straits View, Singapore. The station was built as part of the 1-kilometre (0.62-mile) North–South Line (NSL) Extension, and is the southern terminus of the line. Operated by SMRT Trains, the station serves Marina South Pier and Marina Bay Cruise Centre Singapore.

The extension was first announced as part of the 2008 Land Transport Master Plan and was completed on 22 November 2014. The station features two Art-in-Transit artworks, one of which – Singapore Tapestry – was commissioned as part of the Land Transport Authority's (LTA) gift to Singapore on the nation's 50th anniversary.

== History ==
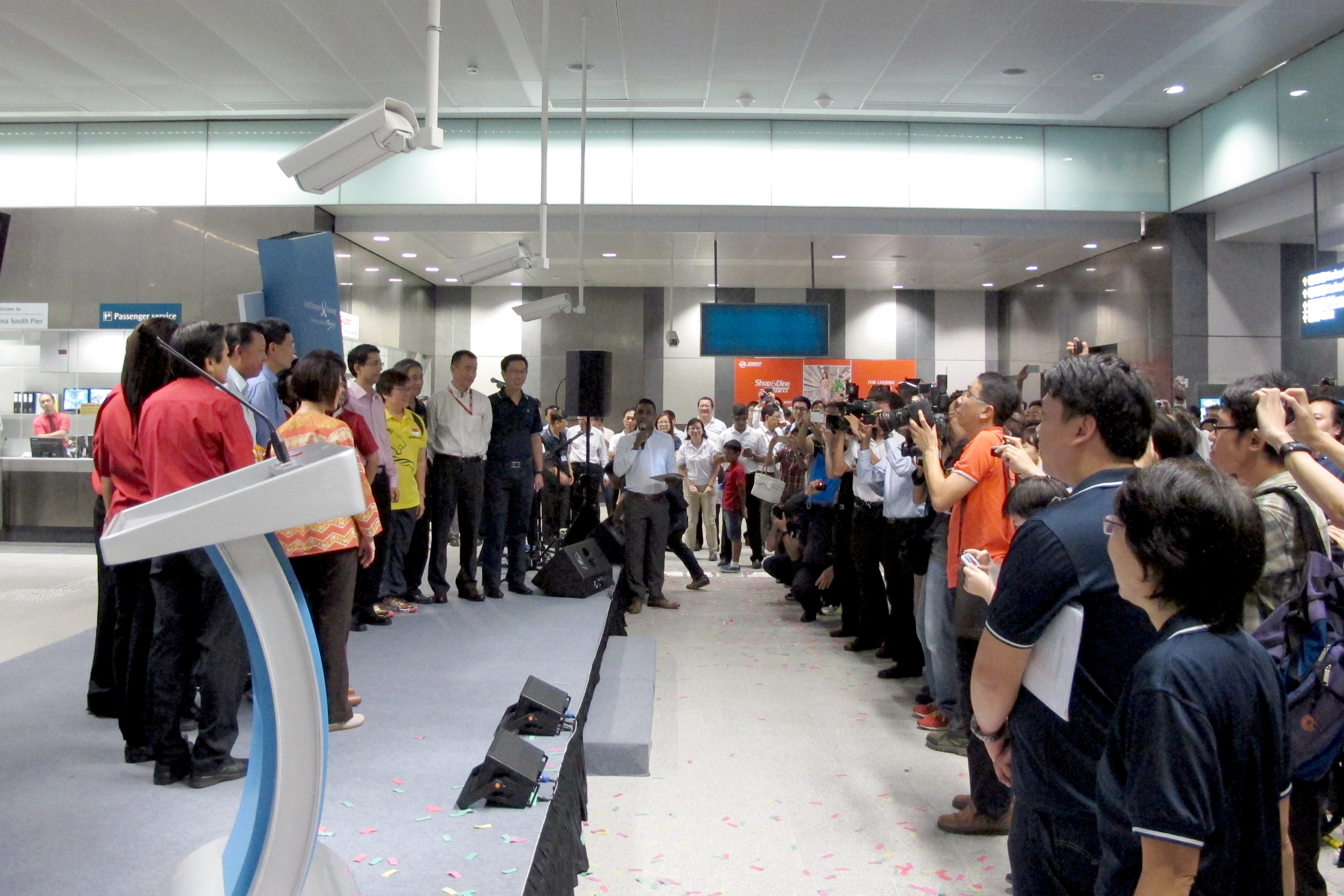
The station's opening ceremony

The North–South Line (NSL), Singapore's first MRT line, opened in stages from 1987 to 1989 and ended at Marina Bay station. In the 2008 Land Transport Master Plan, the Land Transport Authority (LTA) announced a 1-kilometre (0.62-mile) extension of the NSL from Marina Bay, one of several upcoming projects meant to expand Singapore's rail network. The line would extend from Marina Bay station and provide connectivity to future developments in the area, as well as to the Marina South Cruise Centre. The station was provisionally named "Marina Pier".

The contract for the design and construction of the additional station and tunnels was awarded to Samsung C&T Corporation for S$357.5 million (US$245.8 million) in December 2009. Construction of the extension commenced in that month and was expected to be completed by 2014. During the construction, on 8 August 2012, a Bangladeshi worker died while dismantling a support structure that was part of an earth-retaining stabilizing structure. The worker was on one of the beams still attached to another beam being lifted by a crane. Both the man and the beam fell when it was dislodged. The beam crushed the worker.

On 15 August 2014, Minister for Transport Lui Tuck Yew visited the station, where he announced the merger of the Thomson and East Region lines into the Thomson–East Coast Line. As announced on 17 November, the station opened on 23 November that year. An opening ceremony for the station was held the day before the official opening.

== Station details ==
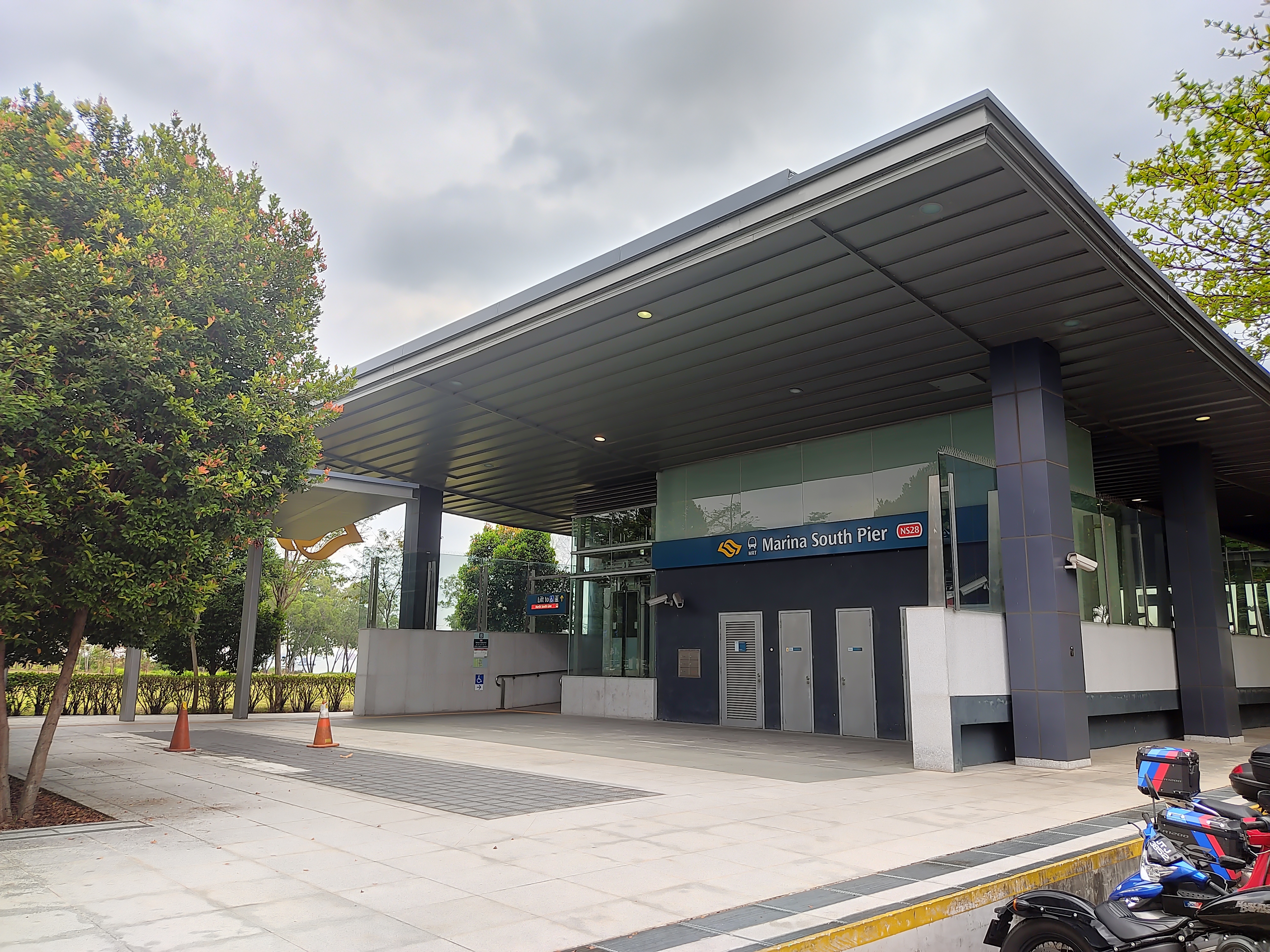
Exit B of the station next to Marina South Pier

Marina South Pier station, the southern terminus of the NSL, has an official station code of NS28. The next station north is Marina Bay. Trains turnaround at this terminus by using crossovers located at both ends of the station. The station is located in Marina South underneath Marina Coastal Drive and south of the Marina Coastal Expressway. The station has two exits, connecting to the Marina South Pier Ferry Terminal and the Marina Bay Cruise Centre, and will serve future developments in the upcoming Marina Bay Downtown area.

A new 6 by 6 m (20 by 20 ft) dance space was established by SMRT Corporation at this station on 15 January 2026. The space, MirrorMoves, was established for its open layout and relatively low pedestrian traffic, enabling dance activities to proceed without disruption to passenger movement.

=== Public art ===
The station displays two artworks as part of the MRT network's Art-in-Transit programme, a public showcase which integrates artworks into the MRT network. An artwork from the Singapore Contemporary Young Artists (SCYA), Past. Transition. Present, depicts the modern and historical landmarks of Singapore in two parts using 27,000 decommissioned EZ-Link cards. When the SCYA were commissioned for the artwork in 2012, the LTA had launched a programme to recall a batch of Sony EZ-Link smartcards, which were being replaced by the CEPAS cards. The SCYA retrieved 50,000 cards from the storerooms in 20 different colours. The artwork was first sketched using the cards' colours; a reduced-size sample, using the cards, was then created via a mosaic composite builder. After the panel size was determined, the cards were arranged in 9 columns of 10 rows per panel. The 216 panels and materials were submitted to Top Pave Pte Ltd which produced the artwork.

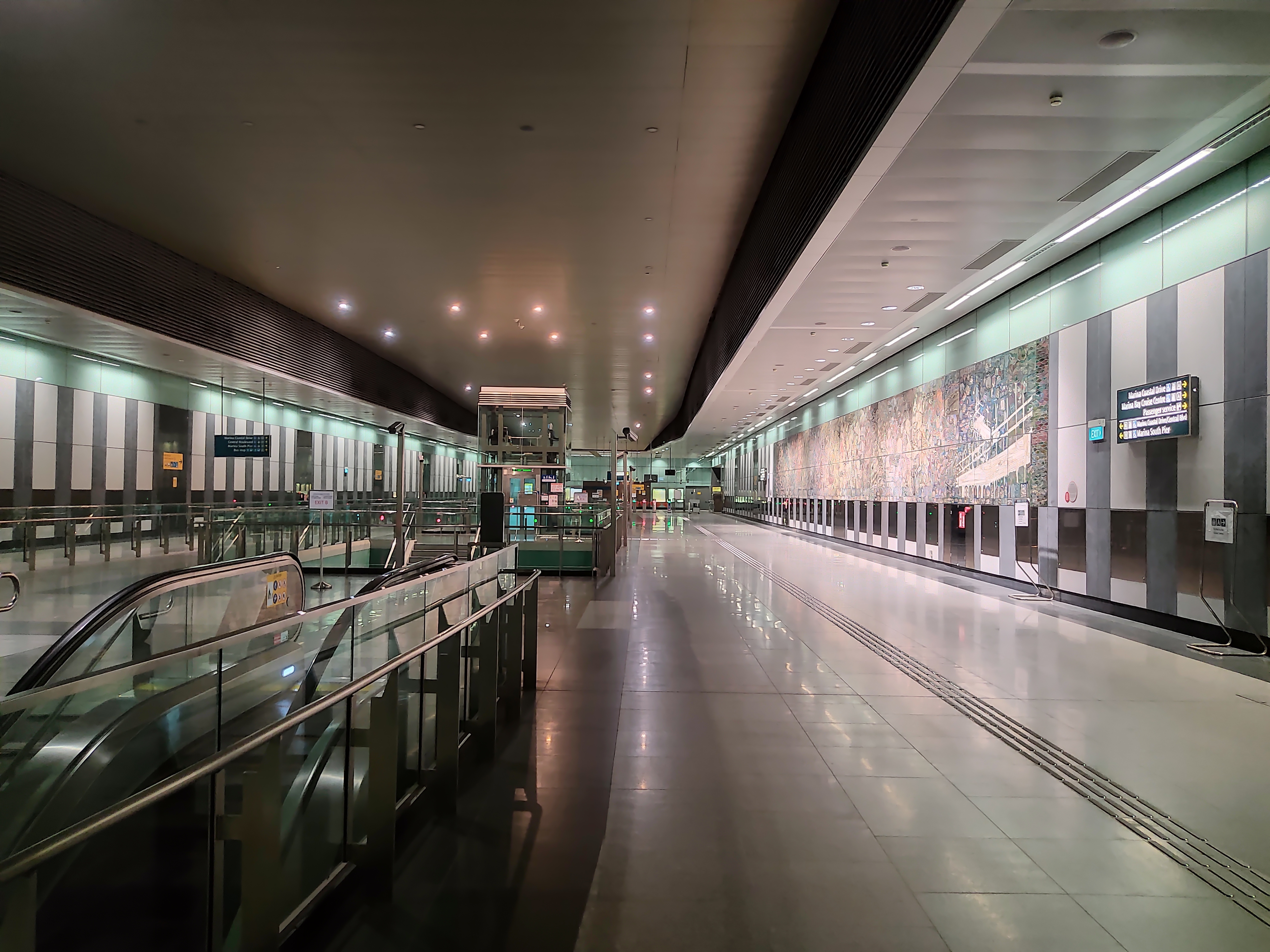
Singapore Tapestry, a gift from the LTA to commemorate Singapore's 50th anniversary, displayed across the station's concourse

Another artwork, Singapore Tapestry by Delia Prvacki, was a gift from the LTA celebrating Singapore's 50th anniversary. The 31-by-2.6-metre (101.7 by 8.5 ft) mural consists of oven-fired clay tiles created by 1,500 people, who were asked to "make clay representations of what they see as the Singapore story". Prvacki's "carpet-like" concept for the artwork was inspired by the "long, rectangular panoramic shape" of the station's interior. The participants' stories, which contained themes of nature, city development, and nation-building, were moulded on clay with the guidance of Prvacki and her protégés. The participants used several ceramic-making methods and techniques to produce allegorical icons such as birds, trees, the Singapore Flag, and a future with driverless cars.

Prvacki hand-painted the various slabs and united them into "a cohesive whole" that reflects the common aspirations of the participants. The artwork is meant to "celebrate" the national "tapestry of life", which is multi-racial yet "united in aspiration". Reflecting on the work, Prvacki hoped the work could be seen as a success of a community-based project guided through "a meaningful concept and artistic approach". She added she was "deeply touched" by those involved and proud to present the work as a gift to Singapore. The participants, as well as Senior Minister Josephine Teo and other LTA officials, attended the artwork's unveiling ceremony on 23 October 2015.
