= Central Region, Singapore =

Central Region
- Region

Other transcription(s)
  - Malay: Wilayah Tengah (Singapura)
  - Chinese: 中央区域 (新加坡)
  - Tamil: மத்திய மண்டலம் (சிங்கப்பூர்)
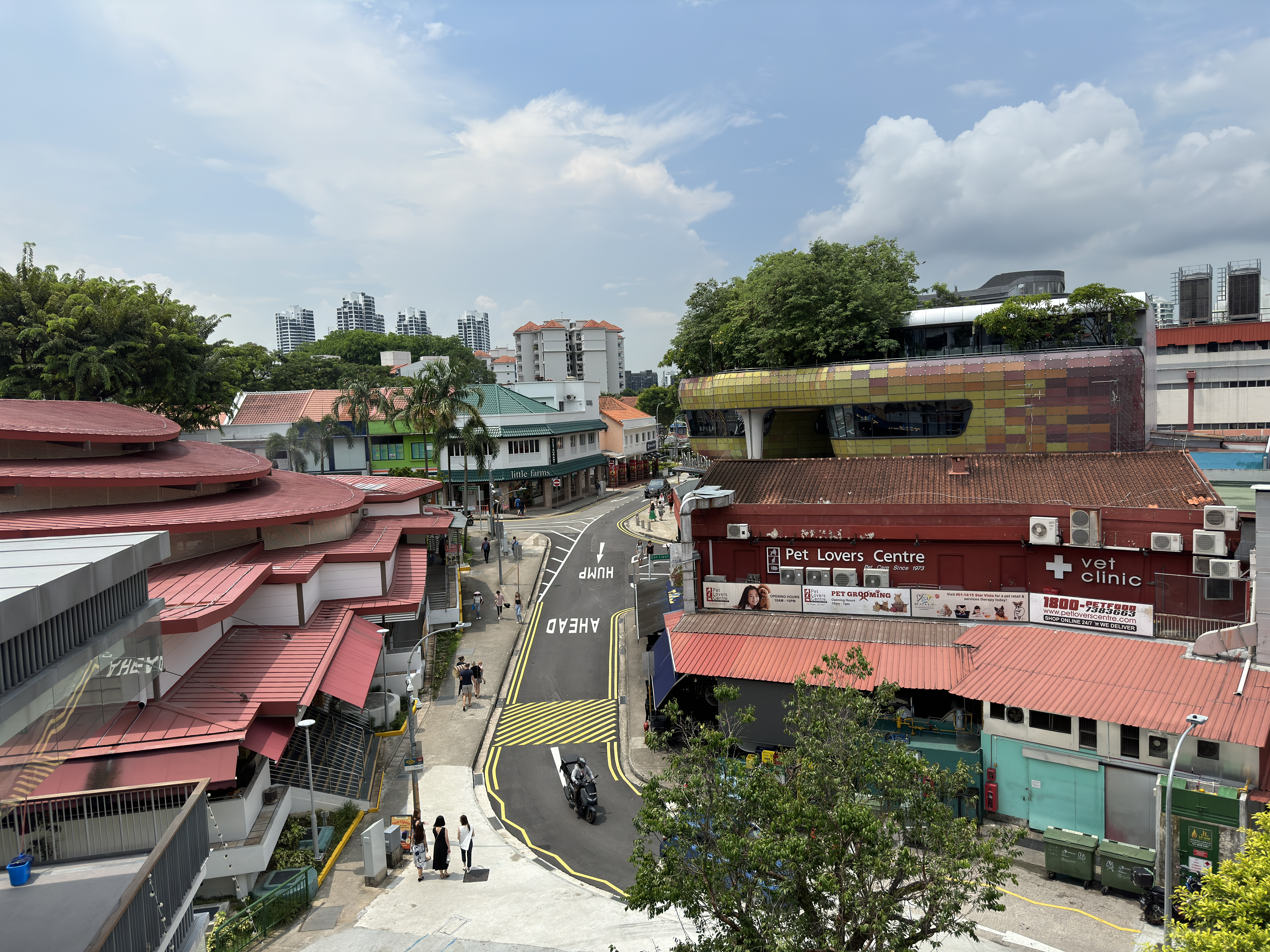
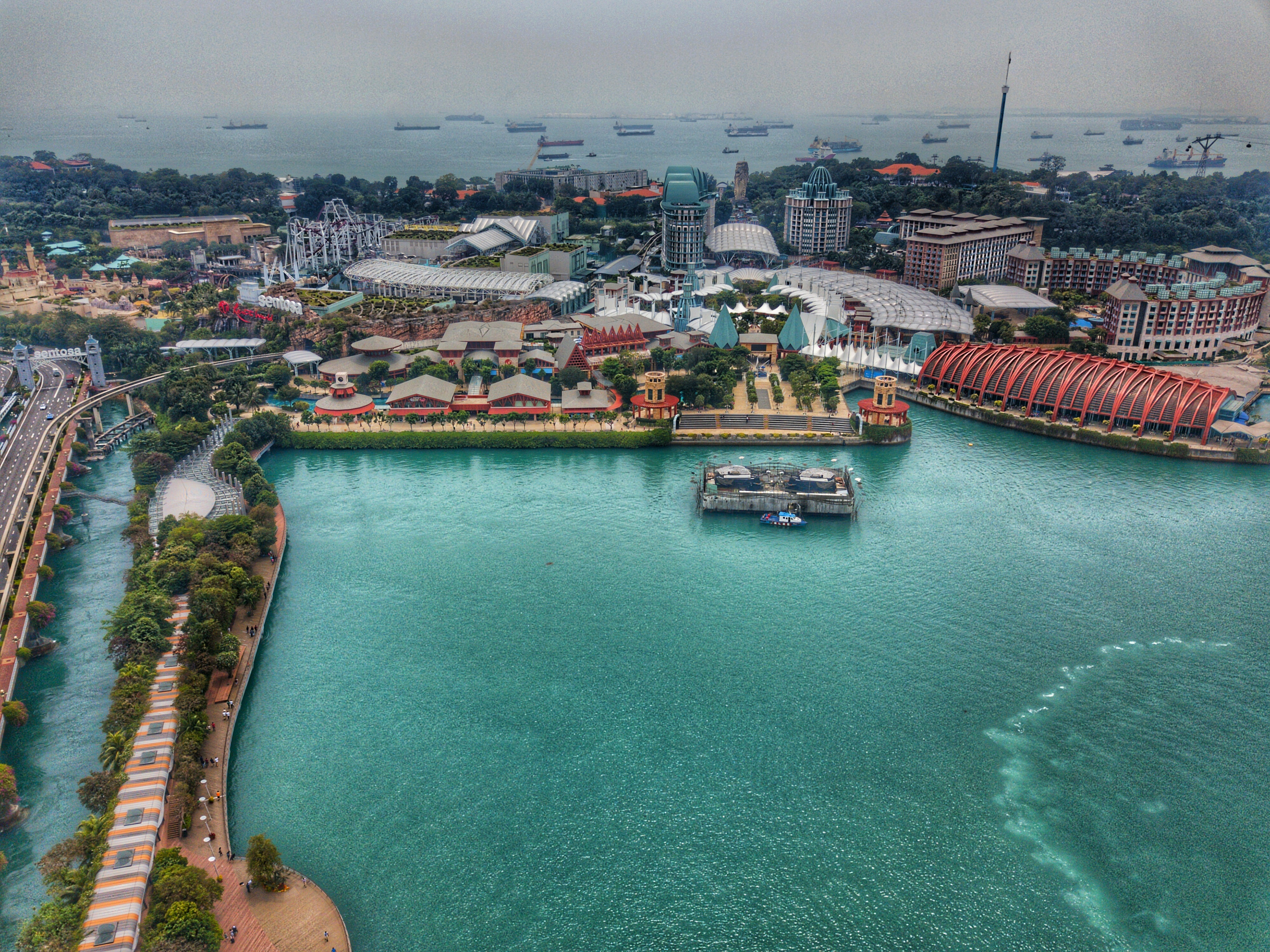
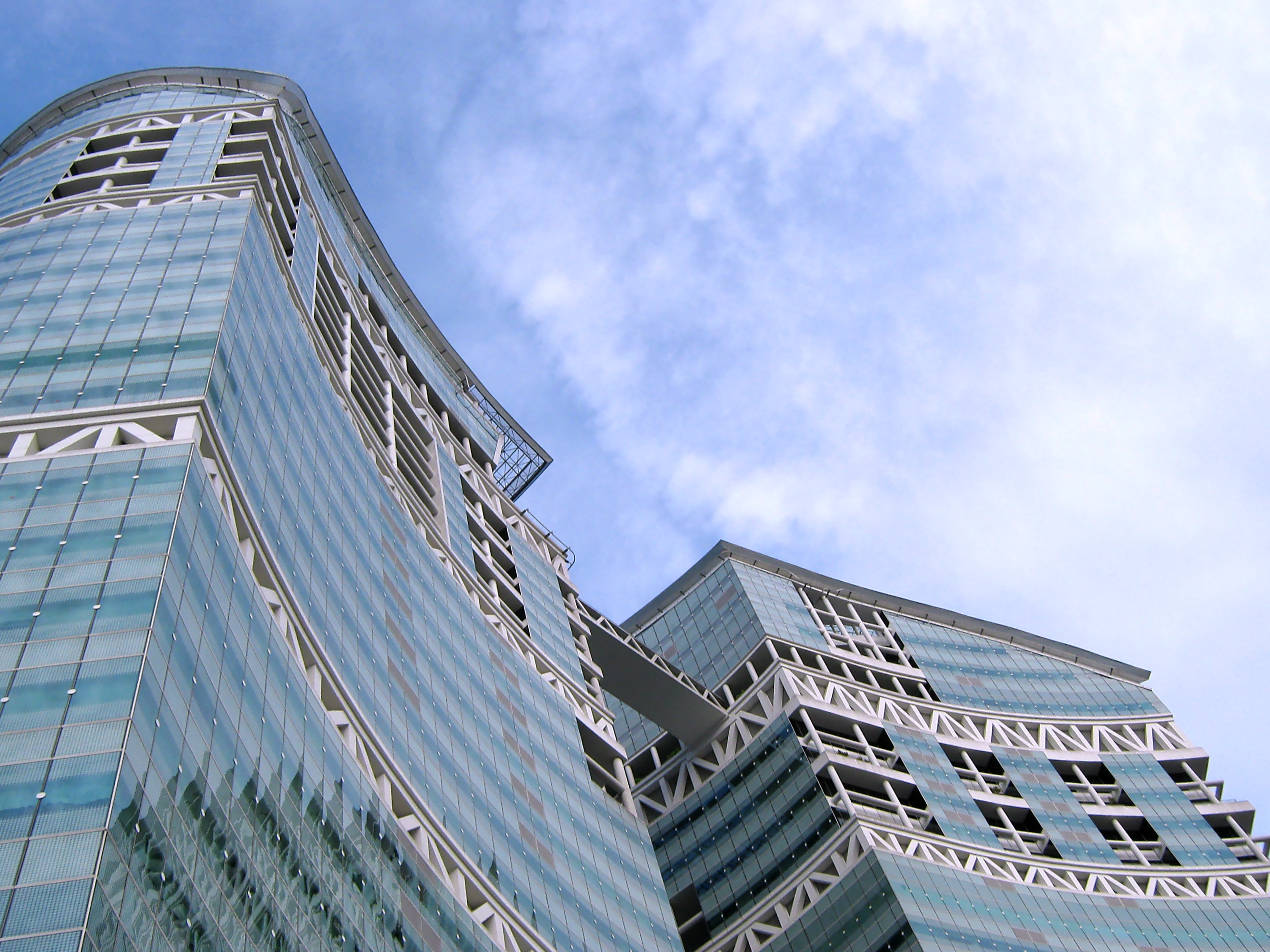
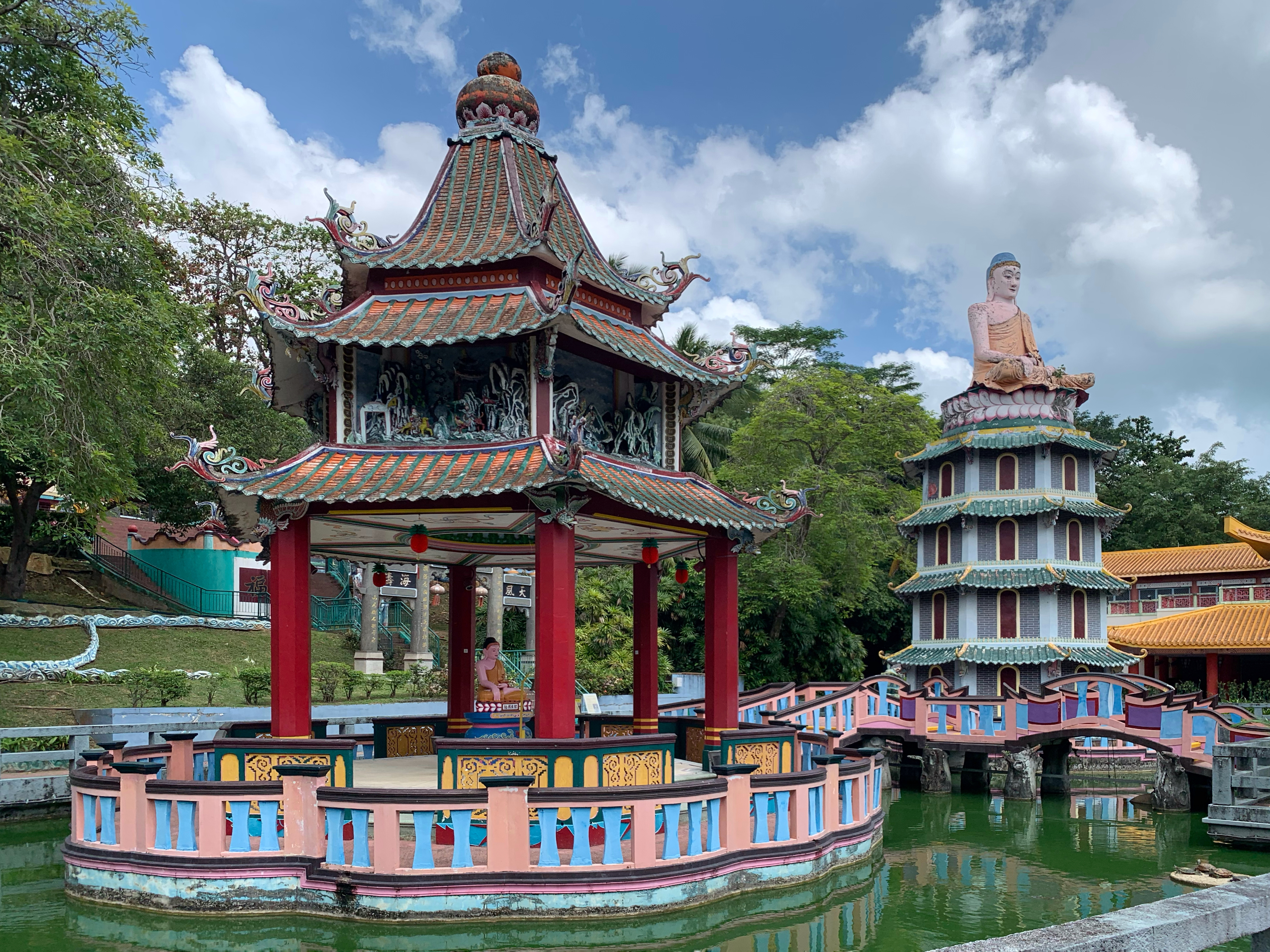
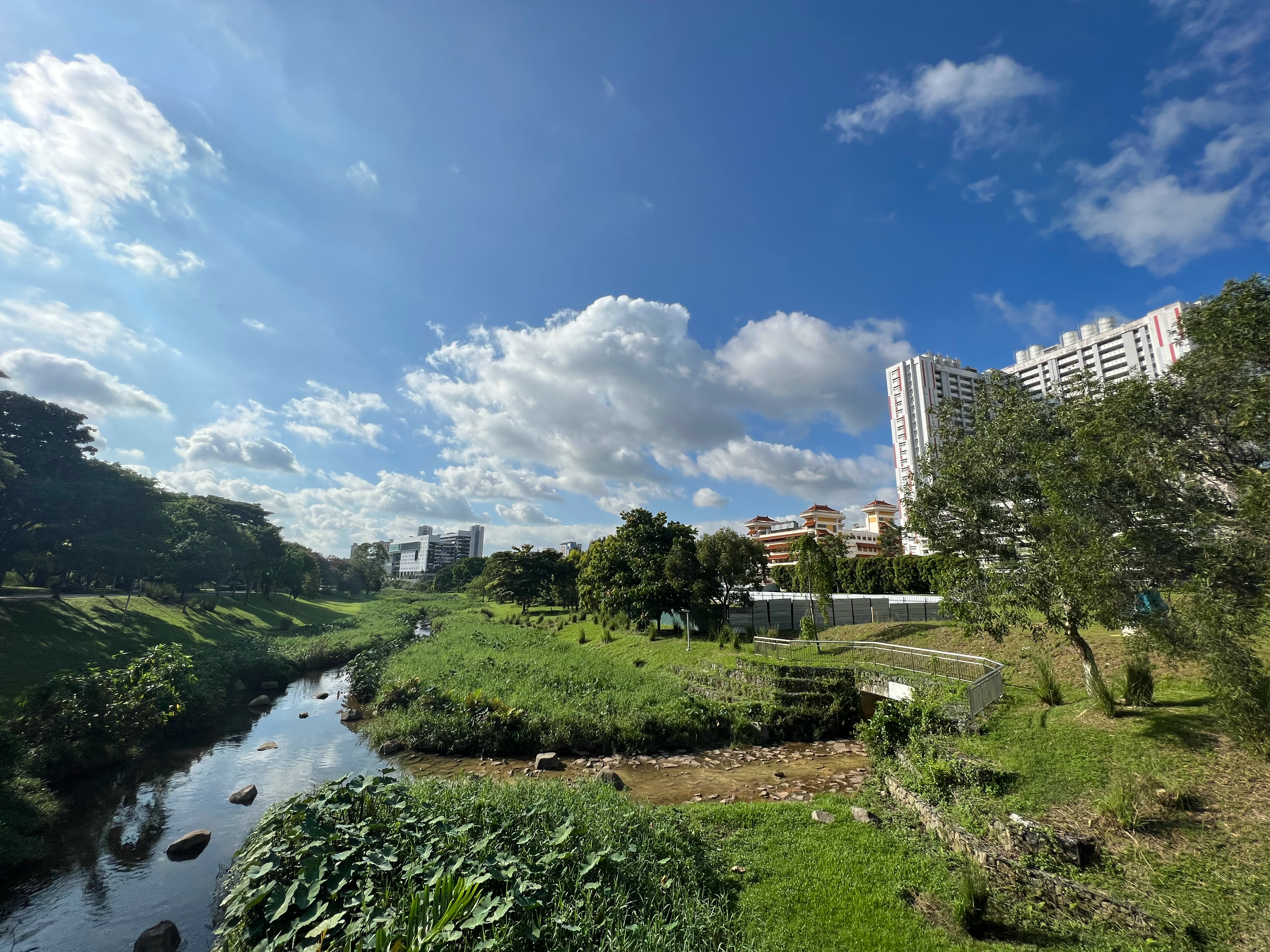
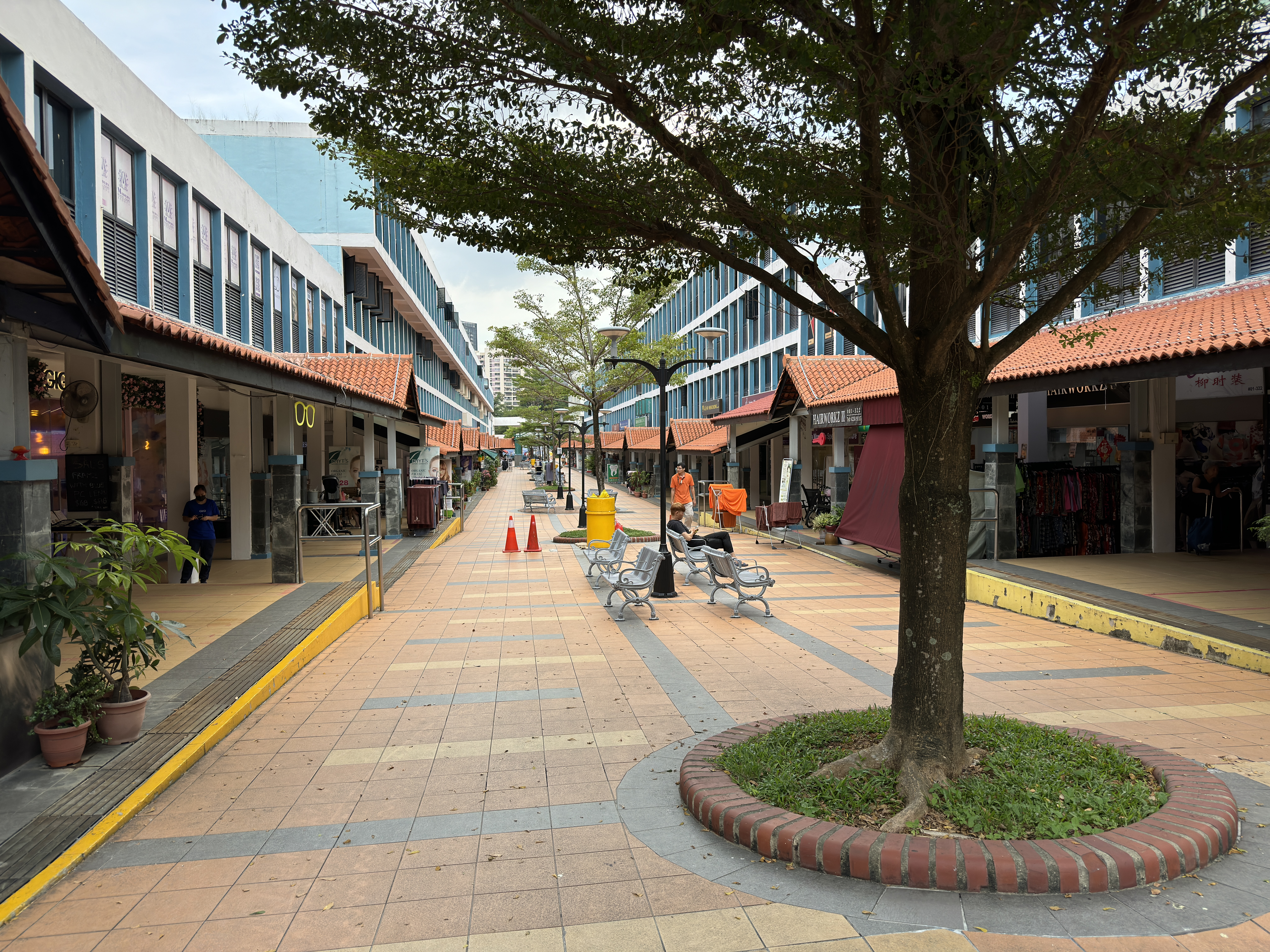
- Holland Village Sentosa Fusionopolis Haw Par Villa Bishan–Ang Mo Kio Park Toa Payoh Town Centre

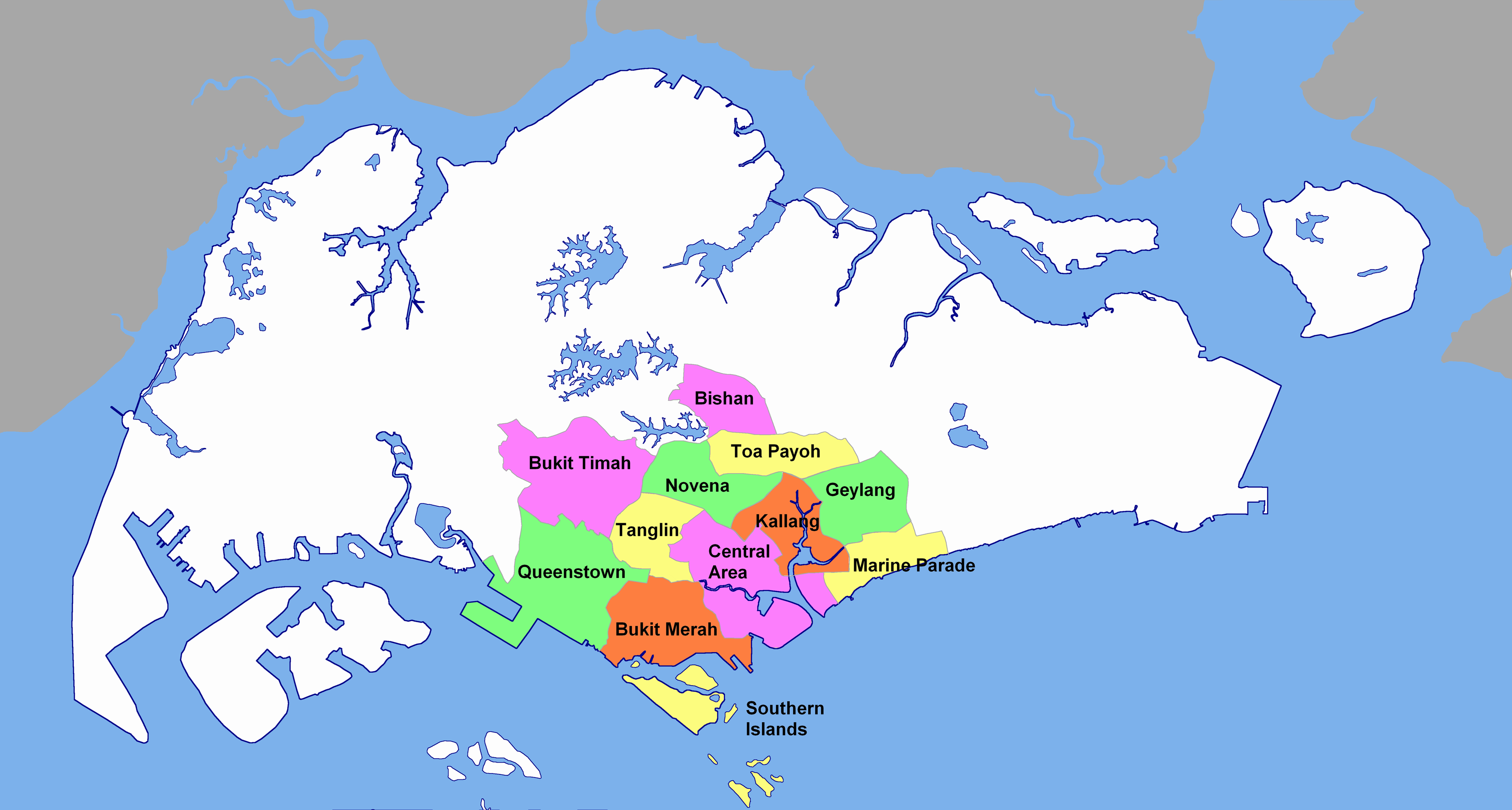
- Planning areas in the Central Region (excluding those in the Central Area, which is depicted as if it were a single PA)
- Coordinates: 1°18′2″N 103°49′18″E
- Country: Singapore
- Planning Areas: 22: Bishan; Bukit Merah; Bukit Timah; Downtown Core; Geylang; Kallang; Marina East; Marina South; Marine Parade; Museum; Newton; Novena; Orchard; Outram; Queenstown; River Valley; Rochor; Singapore River; Southern Islands; Straits View; Tanglin; Toa Payoh
- CDC: Central Singapore CDC; North West CDC; South East CDC; South West CDC
- Regional centre: Central Area (de facto)
- Largest PA: Bukit Merah

Government
  - Mayors: Central Singapore CDC: Denise Phua; North West CDC: Alex Yam; South East CDC: Dinesh Vasu Dash; South West CDC: Low Yen Ling

Area
  - Total: 132.7 km^{2} (51.2 sq mi)

Population (2020)
  - Total: 922,580
  - Rank: 2nd
  - Density: 6,952/km^{2} (18,010/sq mi)
- ISO 3166 code: SG-01

The Central Region is one of the five regions in the city-state of Singapore defined by the Urban Redevelopment Authority for urban planning purposes. It encompasses the country's principal commercial, civic and cultural districts, including the Central Area, and serves as the core of Singapore's metropolitan region. Comprising 132.7 square kilometres (51.2 sq mi) of land area, it includes 11 planning areas (PAs) within the Central Area, as well as another 11 more outside it. The region is home to many of Singapore's national monuments as it was historically the area where the city was first founded and contains the country's only UNESCO World Heritage Site, the Singapore Botanic Gardens.

Although the Central Area is by nature chiefly commercial, especially the area in the Downtown Core, it also includes numerous residential housing of various types, ranging from public Housing and Development Board (HDB) flats to more affluent forms of housing, such as private condominiums and bungalows. There are also at least 1,000 hectares (2,500 acres) of green spaces, including parks, gardens and other recreational spaces linked by 19 km of park connectors.

== History ==
=== Former City of Singapore ===
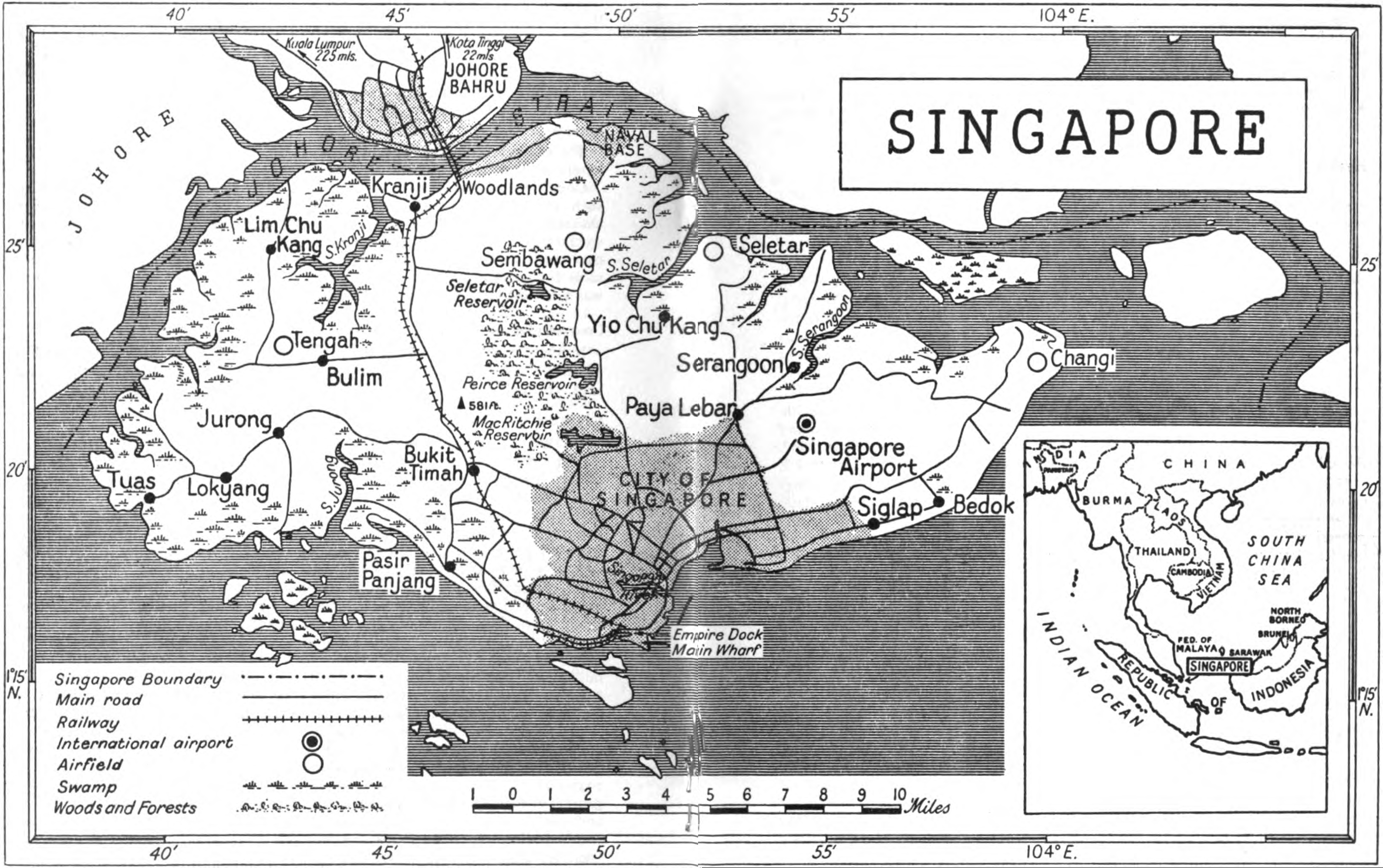
The outline of the city highlighted in a 1959 map of Singapore by the British Information Services.

The Central Region broadly corresponds to the historical extent of the former City of Singapore, which was the capital city of Singapore during the British colonial period and shortly after self-government. The City of Singapore was formally administered by the City Council of Singapore between 1951 and 1959, before its functions were absorbed into the broader state governance structure following full internal self-government in 1959.

During this period, the city area encompassed Singapore's principal commercial port, administrative centre, and surrounding residential districts. Following the separation of Singapore from Malaysia and full independence on 9 August 1965, the city was completely dissolved.

Although the city ceased to exist after 1965, its core urban area continued to develop as Singapore's central business and civic district, forming the basis of what is today the Central Area within the Central Region.

The legacy of the former city is still reflected in the concentration of heritage buildings, civic institutions, and early urban planning layouts within the Central Region, particularly in areas such as the Downtown Core, Singapore River, and Orchard Road.

=== Planning strategies ===
Planning considerations for the URA Master Plan 2003 involving the Central Region took into consideration its existing strengths. Besides being the core area for business and entertainment in the city, it contains districts steeped in history, various housing types, and numerous institutions for education and community life. Despite the highly built-up character, it still boasts a rich variety of parks, open spaces, and other recreational areas. It is also well connected to the rest of the city through extensive road and rail connections, plus an international gateway to the world via the Maritime ports.

The Urban Redevelopment Authority envisaged the introduction of more homes of various types to the area, particularly in the Downtown Core which has been overwhelmingly commercial for the past decades. Supporting institutions and transport networks were upgraded or introduced to cater to the rising resident population in the area.

In terms of business, the New Downtown@Marina Bay was developed into an extension of the existing central business district. To encourage greater land-use flexibility, new business zones and white zones were also introduced. Business and research activities were promoted at the new one-north and medical park within the grounds of the Singapore General Hospital at Outram Park.

For recreation, plans were made to further extend the park connectors to new and existing parks in the region. New sporting facilities were also introduced, such as the redevelopment of the Kallang Sports Hub. Building conservation will continue to be enforced, and nodes for niche activities will be provided for the masses. Plans for spaces catering specifically for youth activities near Orchard Road are a case in point.

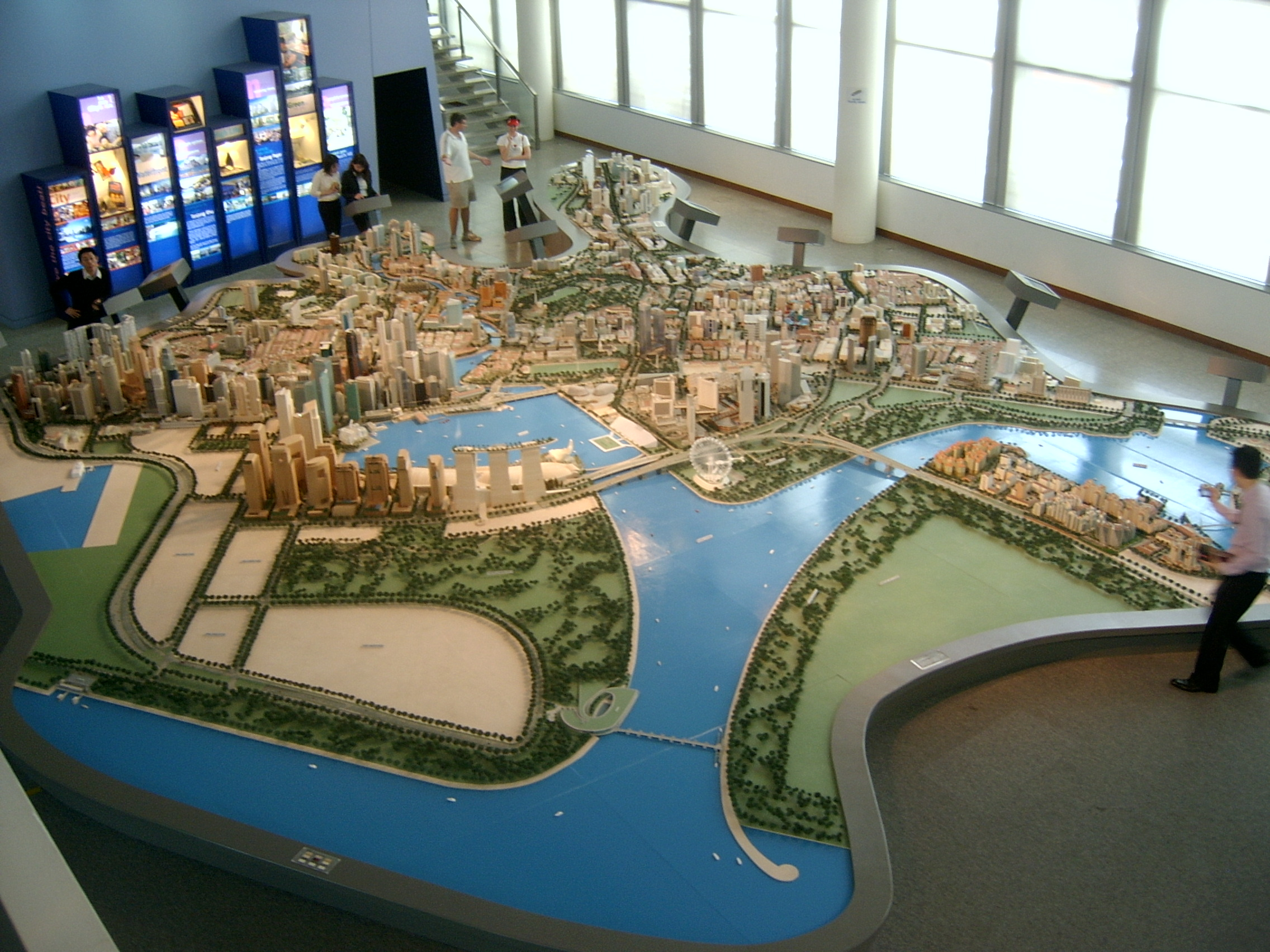
An ever-changing model at the URA Gallery.

== Geography ==
With a land area of 132.7 km^{2} (51.2 sq mi), the Central Region is situated on the southern part of Singapore Island, constituting a total of 21 planning areas. It is the only region to border all the other regions and the Straits of Singapore to the south. The region is also home to the 3.2 kilometers long Singapore River, from its source at Kim Seng Bridge to where it empties into Marina Bay. The region also features Singapore's natural tallest point – Bukit Timah Hill with a height of 163.63 metres (537 ft.) above ground level.

== Economy ==
The Central Region is Singapore's principal economic and financial hub. It contains the country's central business district within the Downtown Core, including major commercial areas around Raffles Place, Marina Bay and Shenton Way. Numerous multinational corporations, financial institutions, government agencies and technology firms maintain offices in the region.

The region also hosts several major retail and mixed-use developments, including Orchard Road, Marina Bay Sands and Suntec City. Research and innovation activities are concentrated at one-north, a high-technology and biomedical research cluster developed by JTC Corporation.

Tourism forms a major component of the regional economy, supported by attractions such as Sentosa, the Singapore Botanic Gardens, the Singapore River precinct and the museums of the Civic District.

== Demographics ==
As of 2020, the Central Region had a population of 922,580 residents. The region contains a diverse mix of mature housing estates, high-density urban neighbourhoods and commercial districts. Major residential areas include Toa Payoh, Queenstown, Bishan and Bukit Merah.

== Transport ==
The Central Region serves as Singapore's primary transport hub and is connected by an extensive network of expressways, arterial roads and rail lines. Major expressways serving the region include the Central Expressway, Ayer Rajah Expressway, Pan Island Expressway and Marina Coastal Expressway.

The region is served by multiple lines of the Mass Rapid Transit system, including the North–South, East–West, Circle, Downtown and Thomson–East Coast lines. Major interchange stations include City Hall, Raffles Place, Dhoby Ghaut and Bishan.

Maritime facilities along the southern waterfront historically formed the core of the Port of Singapore, although many port operations are progressively relocating westward toward Tuas.

== Planning Areas ==
- Bishan
- Bukit Merah
- Bukit Timah
- 11 planning areas of the Central Area
- Geylang
- Kallang
- Marine Parade
- Novena
- Queenstown
- Southern Islands
- Tanglin
- Toa Payoh
