= Marina South =

- Planning Area

Other transcription(s)
  - Chinese: 滨海南
  - Pinyin: Bīnhǎinán
  - POJ: Pin-hái-lâm
  - Malay: Marina Selatan
  - Tamil: மெரினா சவுத்
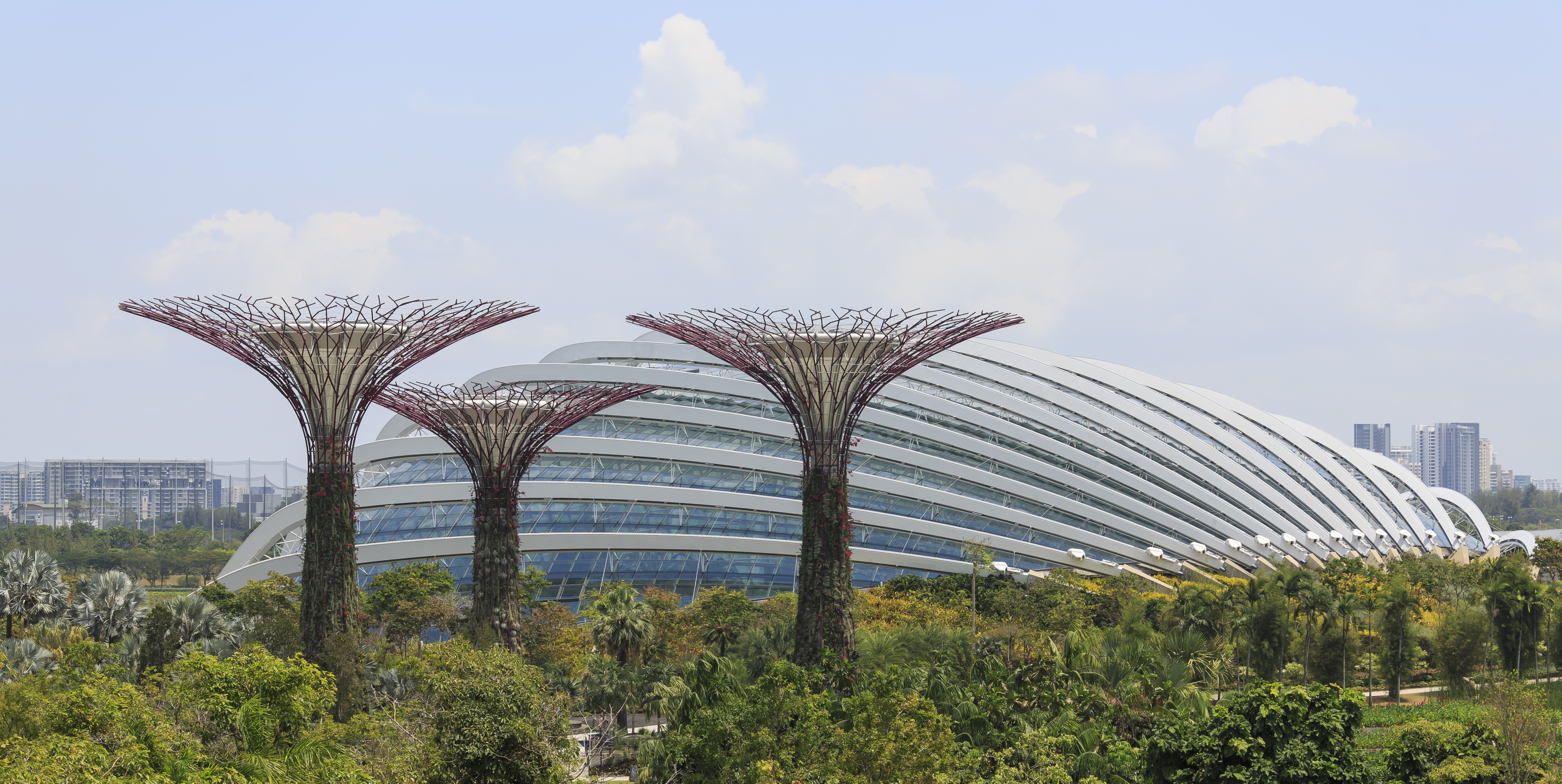
- Gardens by the Bay

- Location in Central Region
- Coordinates: 1.279°N 103.865°E
- Country: Singapore
- Region: Central

Government
  - Members of Parliament: Jalan Besar GRC: Josephine Teo

Area
  - Total: 1.63 km^{2} (0.63 sq mi)
  - Rank: 48th

Population (2026)
  - Total: 0
  - Density: 0.0/km^{2} (0.0/sq mi)

Ethnic groups

Marina South is a planning area located within the Central Area of the Central Region of Singapore. It is largely home to Gardens by the Bay as well as the Marina Barrage. The name has also been used to refer to the larger peninsula the planning area is situated on, which encompasses the planning areas of Straits View and a portion of the Downtown Core.

Marina South is bordered by Marina East to the north and northeast, Straits View to the southwest, the Downtown Core to the north and west, as well as the Singapore Straits to the south and east.

== History ==
=== Reclamation and leisure activities in the 1990s ===
Land at Marina Centre and Marina South was reclaimed from the sea to form a sheltered body of water that came to be known as Marina Bay. It was aimed to provide additional land near the Central Business District. After allowing for the reclaimed land to settle, the area was developed to allow kite flying and the playing of soccer as an interim measure.

A park known as Marina City Park was opened on 30 December 1990, was planned to be a premier park of Singapore's proposed "city of the 21st century". Commercial districts were also constructed to allow outdoor dining, bowling alleys and gaming arcades. In its hey-day back in the early 1990s, teenagers flocked to the area as there used to be Singapore's only Cantonese discothèque – Canto. All of these were closed in the mid-2000s as redevelopment was planned for the area.

=== Re-development ===
A new ferry terminal, Marina South Pier, was built there to replace the old Clifford Pier at Collyer Quay, it was opened on 1 April 2006.

The Marina City Park was later closed from 1 June 2007 for the Gardens by the Bay's site preparatory works.

An integrated resort, Marina Bay Sands, was built on the northern shore of Marina South which was completed in 2010. It is situated next to the Gardens by the Bay and the Marina Bay Financial Centre, which was completed in 2013.

The new Marina Bay Cruise Centre Singapore, was built and opened in October 2012. It is located next to the current Marina South Pier. It has the capability to accommodate some of the world's largest ships. The addition of the new cruise centre helps to boost the growth of the leisure cruise sector in Singapore, apart from the Singapore Cruise Centre.

== Future ==
Marina South was first identified by the URA in 2013 as a car-lite high density residential district next to the new Central Business District at Marina Bay, Singapore. The precinct, which can yield more than 10,000 homes, will also feature retail, office and hotel uses, creating a self-sufficient community. It will also form part of the Greater Southern Waterfront.

The first land parcel, a residential plot on Marina Gardens Lane, will be released for sale in December 2022.
