= Marina City Park =

Park in Singapore

Coordinates: 1°17′N 103°52′E

- Location within Singapore
- Location: Marina South Singapore
- Area: 26.2 hectares (262,000 m^{2})
- Opened: 30 December 1990; 35 years ago
- Closed: 1 June 2007; 19 years ago
- Status: Demolished

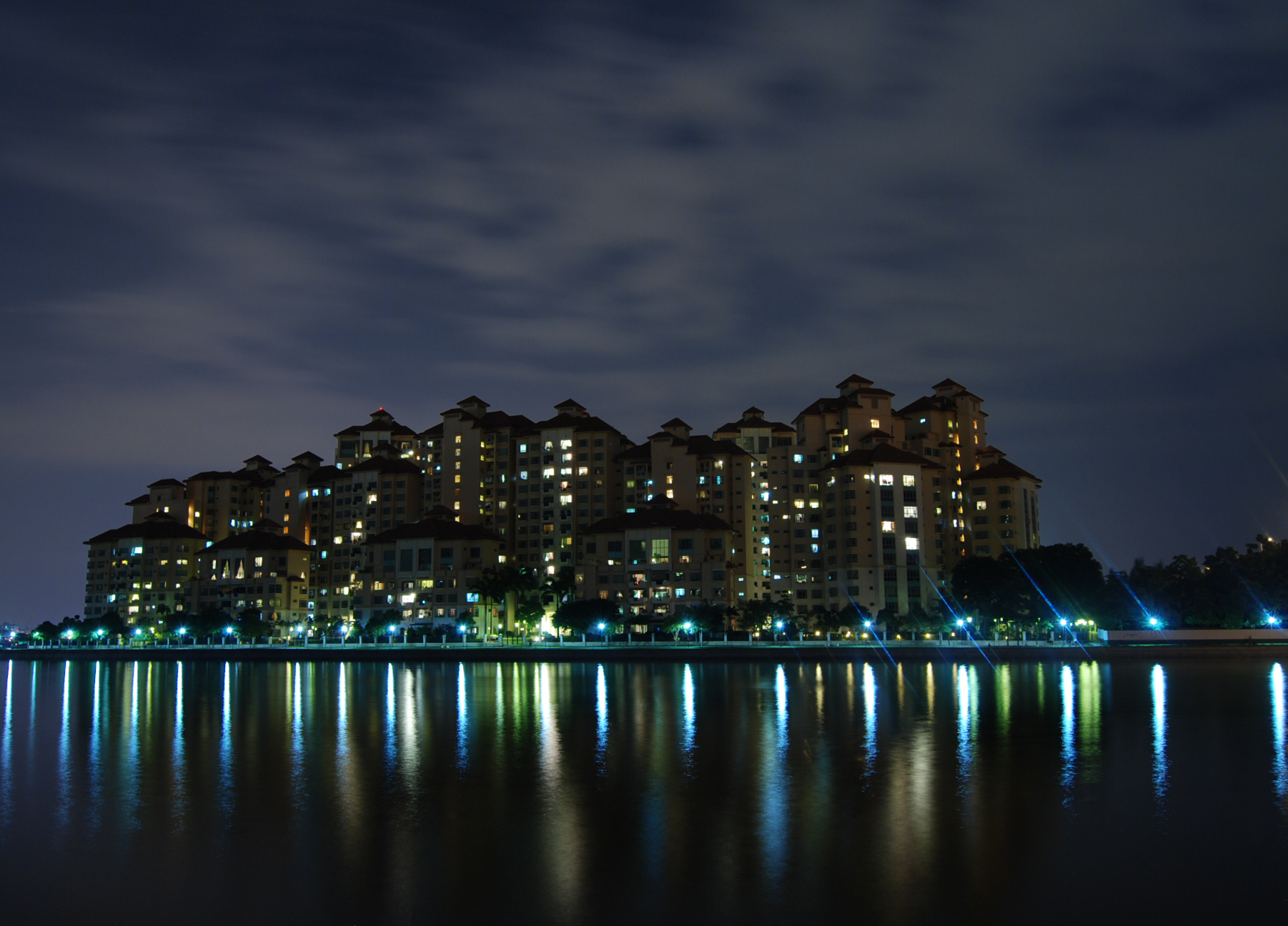
An image of residential housing from Marine City Park.

Marina City Park was a park in Singapore formerly located at Marina South, with entrances at Marina Boulevard and Marina Park. Standing on about 26.2 ha (64.7 acres) of reclaimed land, this park was planned to be a premier park of Singapore's proposed "city of the 21st century", as part of Singapore's vision to be a "City in a Garden". The park was closed on 1 June 2007 to make way for the Gardens by the Bay.

== Features ==
Officially opened on 30 December 1990 by Minister of Labour Lee Yock Suan on the reclaimed land known as Marina South, the park had a two-tiered large pond with a fountain known as The Spirit of the Sculptural Fountain which could sprout water up 18 metres high. The series of waterfront terraces besides the pond, offered an enchanting view of the greenery on the islands in the pond. There are three large open spaces where major events can be held.

Sculptures are also found here, ranging from contemporary ones such as Soaring Vision, Spirit of Youth, and Sculptural Fountain to historical ones like the 12 Chinese Legendary Heroes.

The Constellation Plaza helped to trace the constellation during the evenings. The Sundial Plaza at the seafront facing the Promenade is installed for the young to learn how to tell time.

There used to be a sandy playground at the southern end of the park, but the former has been demolished to make way for new construction works.

== Closure ==
Marina City Park was closed from 1 June 2007 for the Gardens by the Bay's site preparatory works.
