= Marina Bay Cruise Centre Singapore =

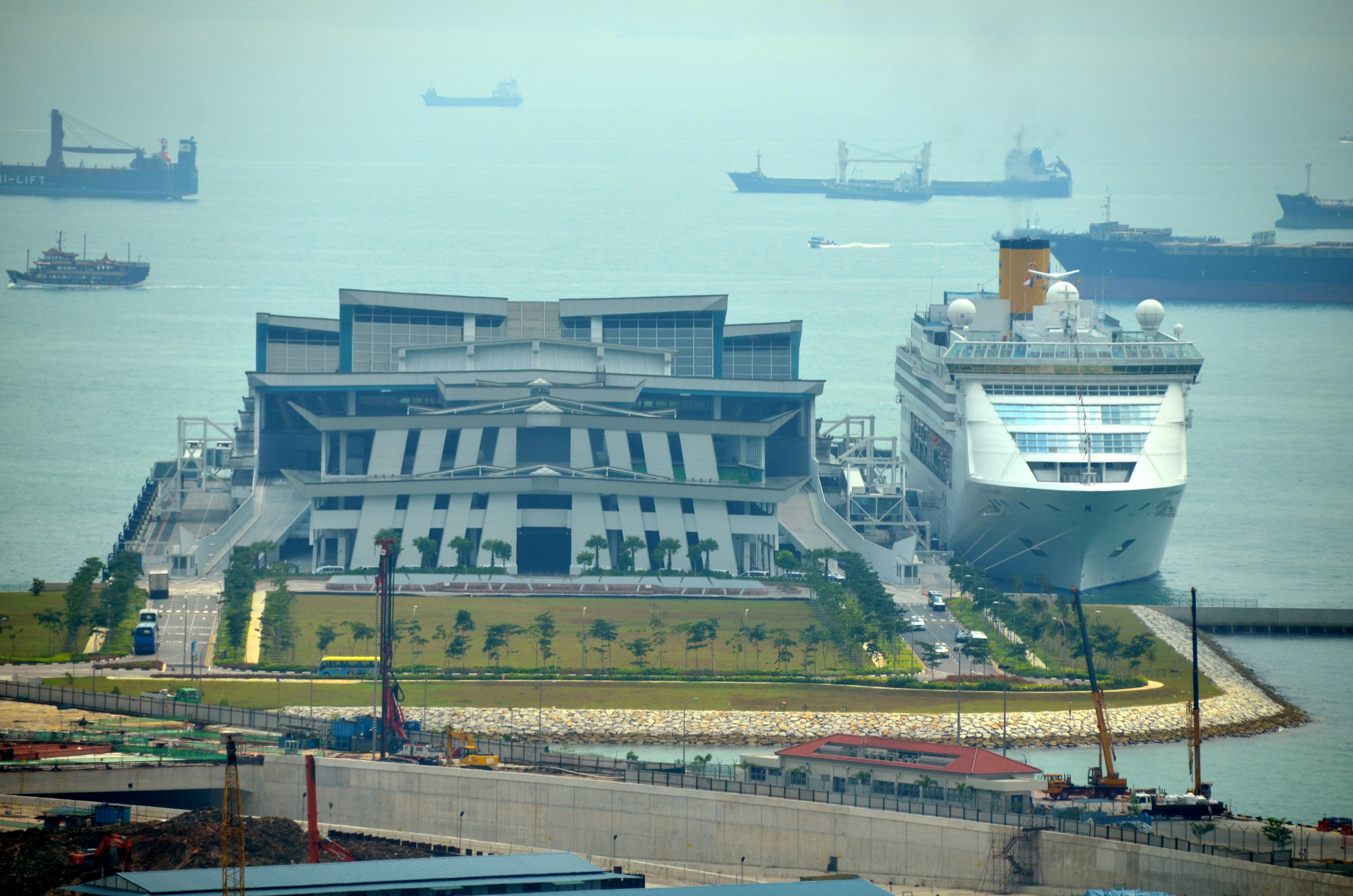
- Costa Victoria docked at Marina Bay Cruise Centre Singapore, November 2012

- Location within Singapore

General information
- Status: Operating
- Type: Cruise terminal
- Location: 61 Marina Coastal Drive, Singapore
- Coordinates: 1.2708°N 103.8622°E
- Construction started: October 2009
- Completed: 22 May 2012
- Inaugurated: 22 October 2012
- Operator: SATS-Creuers Cruise Services

Technical details
- Floor count: 3
- Floor area: 60,000 m^{2} (650,000 sq ft)

Design and construction
- Architects: RSP Architects Planners and Engineers; Bermello, Ajamil and Partners
- Developer: Singapore Tourism Board
- Main contractor: Sato Kogyo

Website
- mbccs.com.sg

The Marina Bay Cruise Centre Singapore (MBCCS) is a cruise terminal in Singapore, located at Marina South. The construction of the S$500 million terminal began in October 2009 and was completed on 22 May 2012. It received its first ship, the Voyager of the Seas, on 26 May 2012. The official opening ceremony of MBCCS was held on 22 October that year.

The terminal is operated by SATS-Creuers Cruise Services (a joint venture of SATS Ltd and Creuers del Port de Barcelona). The Singapore Cruise Centre at HarbourFront is set to be consolidated with MBCCS to form a cruise hub as the leisure cruise sector continues to grow in Singapore.

== History ==
The impetus for construction came from difficulties many cruise operators had with the current Singapore Cruise Centre which is in a narrow channel with a dead end. The geographical limitations of the site impose height and berth limits on the cruise operators. The new location at Marina South has deep waters, a large turning basin, and no height restrictions, which enables it to accommodate the largest cruise ships being built now.

On 18 March 2009, the Ministry of Trade and Industry (MTI) and Singapore Tourism Board (STB) revealed the cruise terminal's design.

On 29 July 2011, SATS submitted a bid to manage and operate the MBCCS, in partnership with European cruise terminal operator Creuers Del Port de Barcelona SA. Singapore Cruise Centre also participated in the tender but it was won by SATS in the end.

A S$7 million upgrade was completed in 2014. A fourth passenger bridge was built to expedite boarding and disembarking. The taxi pick-up area was also redesigned to allow simultaneous boarding.

In 2017, amidst growing demand in the cruise tourism industry, 20 more check-in counters were added, making a total of 120 check-in counters available.

On 11 April 2025, it was announced that the cruise centre will undergo a S$40 million expansion, which will increase its capacity from 6,800 to 11,700 passengers. The expansion was completed in October 2025.

== Pier and terminal design ==
Up to 360 metres (1,180 ft) in length with a draft of up to 11.5 metres (38 ft) (including mooring dolphins of 60 metres (200 ft)) and spanning over 120 metres (390 ft), it has the ability to berth ships of up to 220,000 GT. With the terminal's footprint of 120 by 335 metres (394 by 1,099 ft) and terminal space of 28,000 square metres (300,000 sq ft), it also houses a car park and coach bay area of about 32,000 square metres (340,000 sq ft) with design load of 6,800 passengers.

== Transport connections ==
=== Rail ===
The nearest MRT station is Marina South Pier MRT station, located about 650 metres (2,130 ft) from MBCCS. The upcoming Marina South MRT station is due to open in the future. Both stations will serve the cruise centre and its vicinity.

=== Bus ===
There is a bus stop in the MBCCS that is served by route 400 to the Central Business District area.
