= Urban Redevelopment Authority =

Singapore government agency

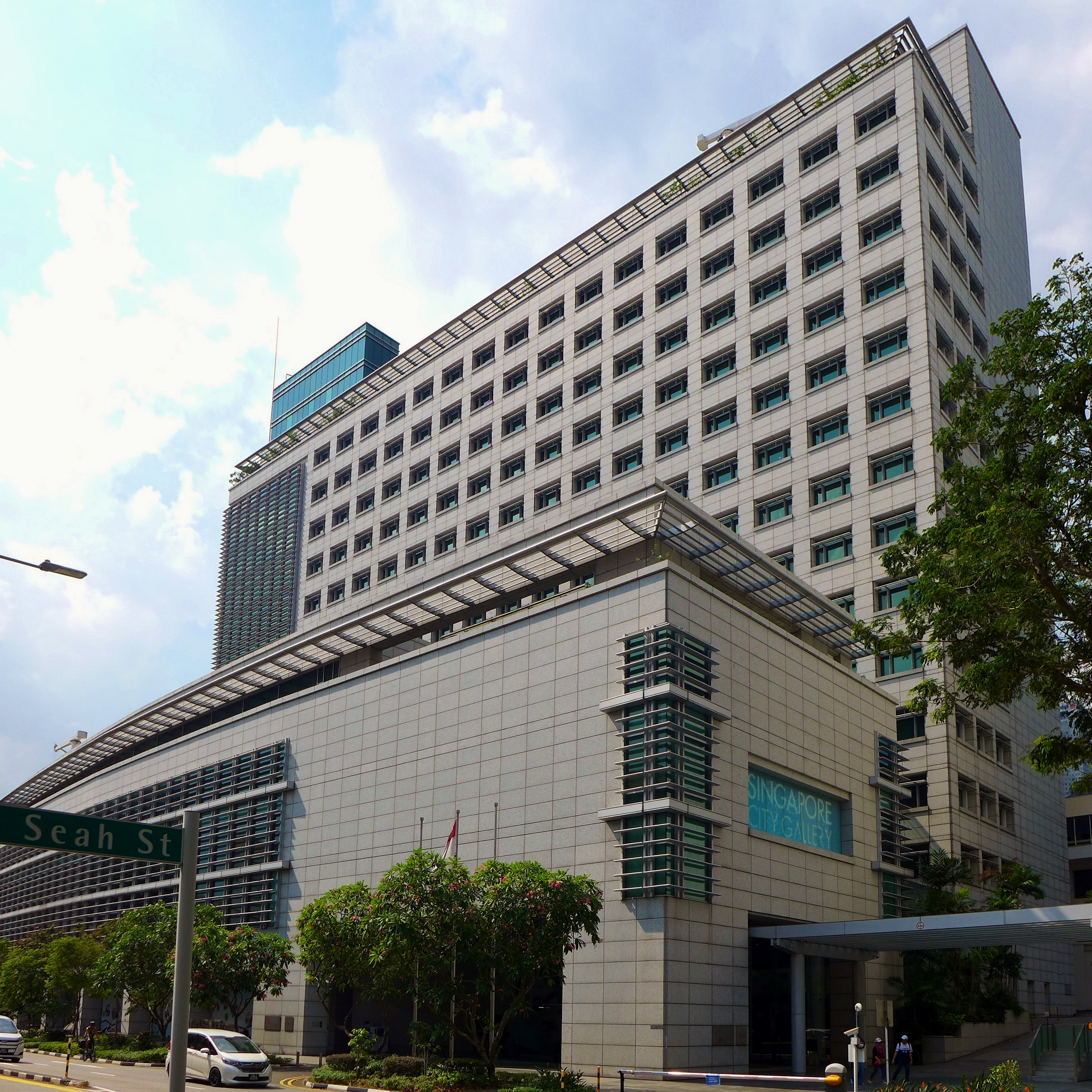
- Headquarters at URA Centre

Agency overview
- Formed: 1 April 1974; 52 years ago
- Jurisdiction: Government of Singapore
- Headquarters: Singapore
- Agency executives: Ow Foong Pheng, Chairman; Lim Eng Hwee, CEO
- Parent agency: Ministry of National Development (Singapore)
- Website: www.ura.gov.sg
- Agency ID: T08GB0064C

The Urban Redevelopment Authority (URA) is the national urban planning authority of Singapore, and a statutory board under the Ministry of National Development of the Government of Singapore.

== Mission ==
The authority was established on 1 April 1974, and is of critical importance to the city-state. Singapore is an extremely dense country where land usage is required to be efficient and maximized. The city state is trying to reduce land wastage in the face of land shortage in the area.

== Responsibilities ==
=== Land use planning ===
URA's main responsibility is land-use planning. URA planners devise both long-term strategic plans, along with medium-term plans, which are reviewed every five to ten years. These plans designate the land use and urban density for the entirety of Singapore. These designations are divided by URA into 55 planning areas.

=== Development control ===
It is the responsibility of URA to evaluate and grant planning approval for development projects from the public and private sectors. In approving development applications, the URA states its goal is to foster orderly development conforming to the planning guidelines as stated in the statutory Master Plan and the existing control factors. URA tries to provide quality service when working in partnership with building industry professionals and the general public to foster development.

=== Urban design ===
URA is responsible for the urban design of the city. For areas of special interest, such as the Singapore River area, the Orchard Road shopping belt, and the Marina Bay, URA devises specific medium and short-term urban design and land use plans. It also works with other government agencies in enhancing the city's urban design.

=== Building conservation ===
Building conservation in Singapore is the responsibility of URA, which issued a Conservation Master Plan in 1989. This plan laid down guidelines and processes for the conservation of culturally and historically significant buildings. More than 7,000 buildings in Singapore have been gazetted as conserved buildings.

=== Land sales ===
URA also sells land by tender on behalf of the Singapore government to meet demand from private developers. URA deals with tenders for government land and applications to buy reserved land.

=== Car park management ===
The URA plays an important role in managing all public car parks outside of Housing Development Board estates. It provides information and services to the public in regard to coupon parking, season parking, and heavy vehicle parking. URA also sets the bylaws to parking infringement and fines.

== URA Centre ==
In keeping with URA's function as the authority for urban design in Singapore, the URA Centre was conceptualised by URA's in-house architects. Kenzō Tange Associates and Kajima Design Asia Pte Ltd served as design consultants. The building consists of two blocks: a 16-floor tower block, and a 5-floor podium block.

== Singapore City Gallery ==
The URA maintains a regular and ever updated public urban planning exhibition on the first three floors of their headquarters. Highlights include three scale models of the island of Singapore, the central region, and the central area. Special exhibits and models on current projects and developments island-wide are regularly displayed as well.

Model in the lobby of the URA building.

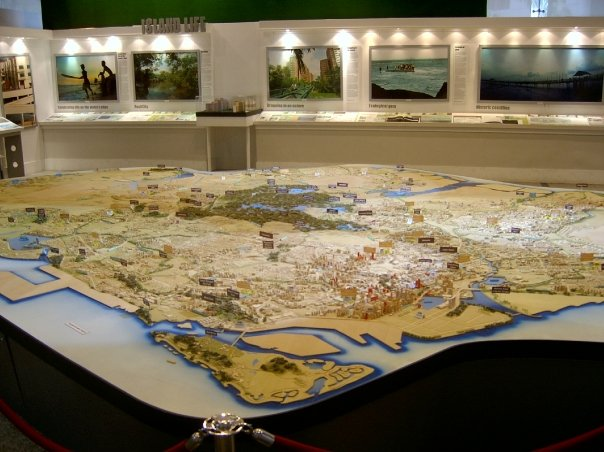
Scale model of the island found in the Singapore City Gallery.

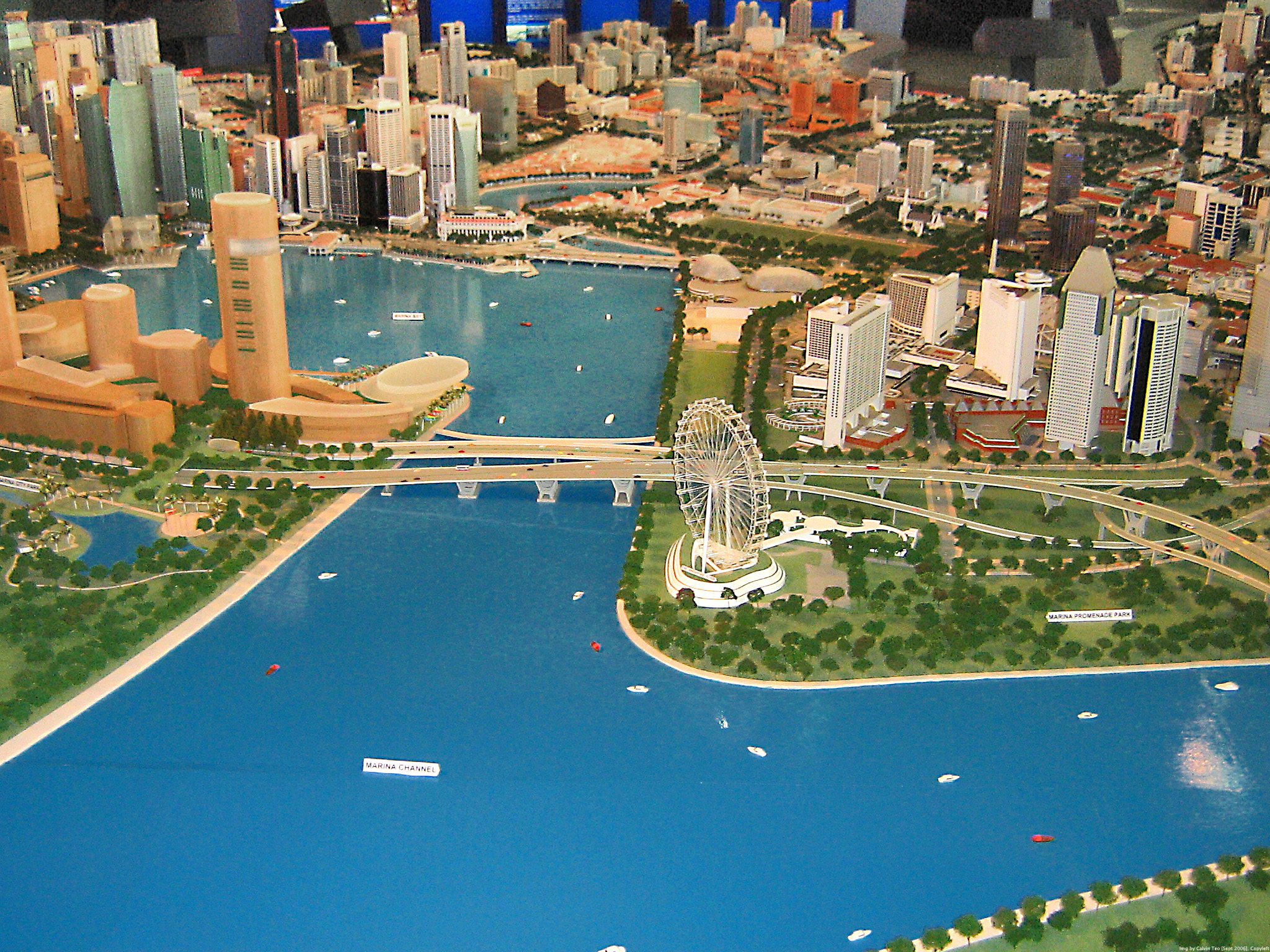
The Singapore City Gallery Exhibit - URA is responsible for the urban planning of Singapore.

== See also ==
- Development Guide Plan
- Urban planning in Singapore
- Planning Areas of Singapore
