= Future developments in Singapore =

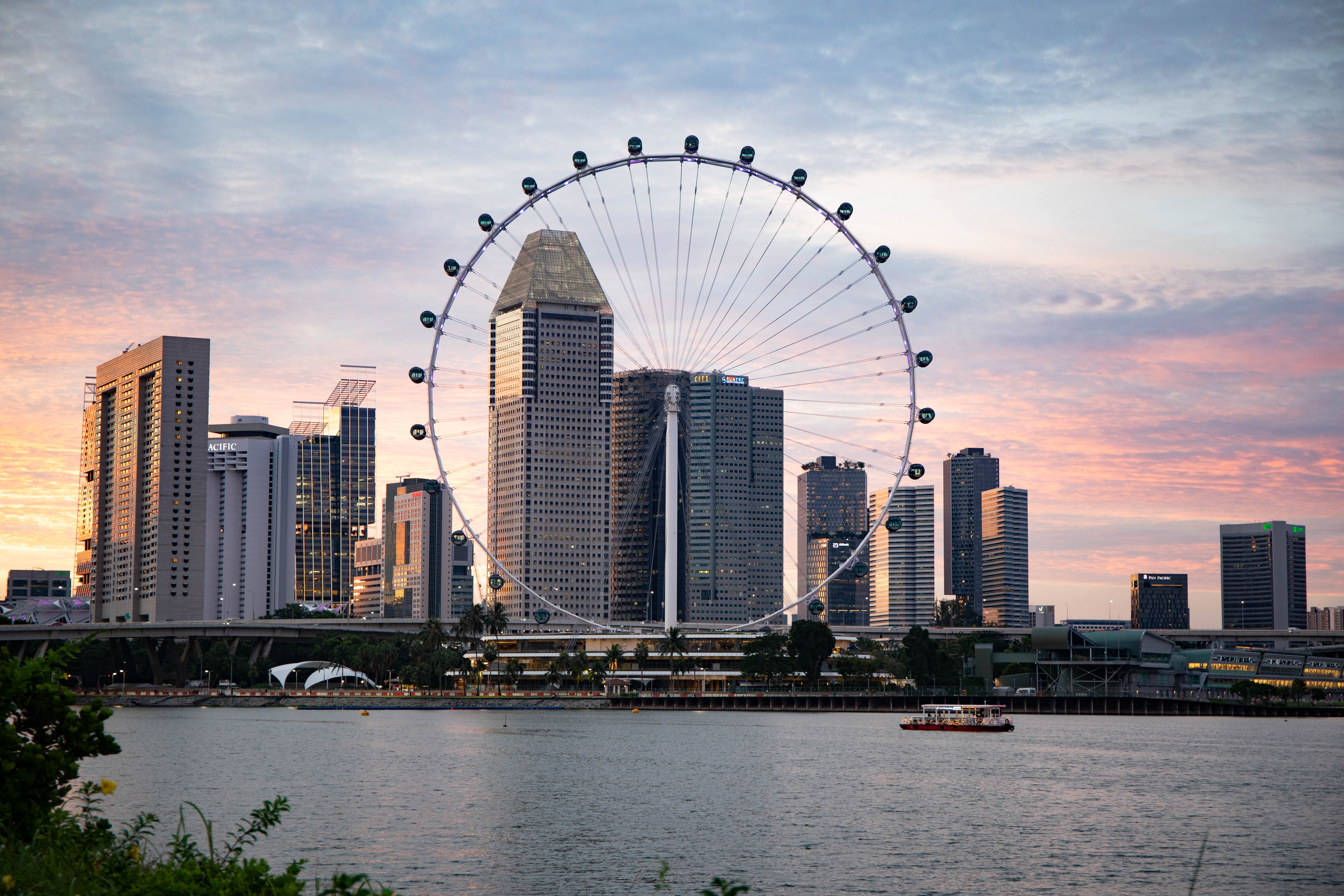
View of Marina Centre and the Singapore Flyer at dusk.

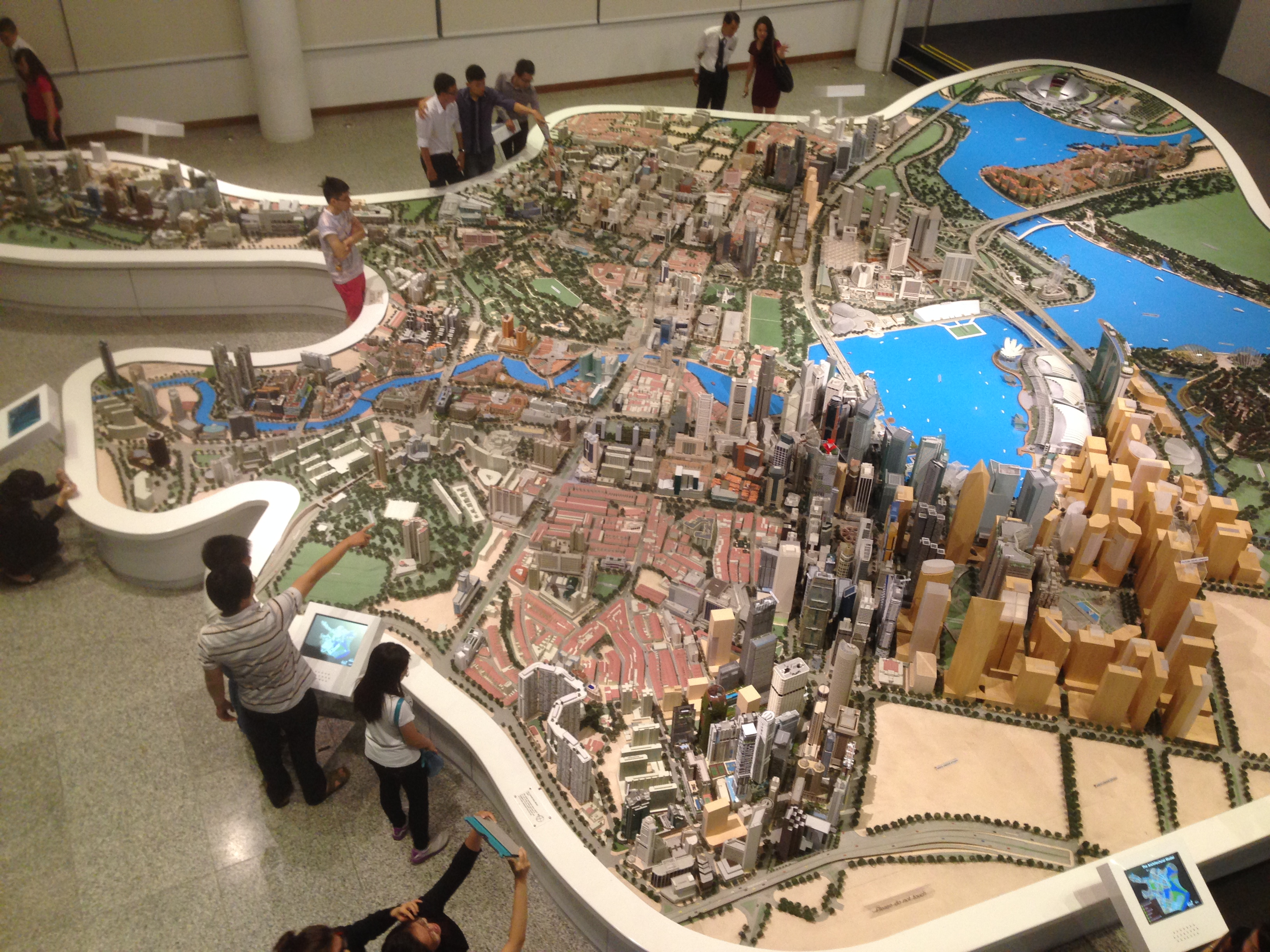
Model of the Downtown Core at the Singapore City Gallery.

This is a list of notable future developments in Singapore. Most of these projects are currently under construction and are scheduled for completion within the next five years. This list is not exhaustive, and some future developments may not be included.

== Commercial ==
=== 8 Shenton Way (Redevelopment of AXA Tower) ===
Announced by the Urban Redevelopment Authority on 5 August 2022, the upcoming mixed-use development to replace the existing AXA Tower in Tanjong Pagar has been granted a maximum approved height of 305 metres. Surpassing the 284 metres-tall Guoco Tower, the 63-storey skyscraper is set to be Singapore's tallest building when completed in 2028. The development will comprise commercial spaces, offices, a hotel, and residential units with sky terraces.

=== CanningHill Piers and CanningHill Square (Redevelopment of Liang Court) ===
A new mixed-use, integrated development named CanningHill Piers will be built on the current Liang Court complex with a 696-unit condominium spread across two residential towers, a 2-storey retail mall named CanningHill Square, a 460- to 475-room Moxy hotel by Marriott replacing Novotel, and a 192-unit Somerset serviced residence. Developed by CapitaLand, Ascott REIT and City Developments Limited, the redeveloped complex will open in phases from 2024.

The development will be directly linked underground to the Fort Canning MRT station.

=== Chong Pang City ===
Chong Pang City; originally known as Chill @ Chong Pang, is an upcoming 0.9-hectare community integrated development in Yishun, to be constructed on a site currently occupied by Chong Pang Community Club and Block 102 Yishun Avenue 5. Announced on 8 September 2020, the development will house a new community club, a market and hawker centre, and retail shops. It will also feature three swimming pools, a gymnasium, and fitness studios.

The adjacent Chong Pang Market and Food Centre will be relocated to the new development when completed. The site will then be redeveloped into a community plaza by 2028.

The development, then having renamed to Chong Pang City, broke ground on 26 March 2023 with its design unveiled. It is expected to open in 2027.

=== Greater Southern Waterfront ===
Plans for a southern waterfront city were briefly announced in 2013 as part of a plan to consolidate port activities in Tuas. These plans were elaborated as a Greater Southern Waterfront in 2019, a 2,000ha area with 30 km of coastline from Marina Bay to Pasir Panjang. They include the redevelopment of Keppel Club with 9,000 HDB and private homes. and more office spaces near homes bringing about new ways of living. Links to other nature areas will also be created to places like West Coast Park and East Coast Park, Rail Corridor and Sentosa. In addition, new attractions like the redevelopment of Pasir Panjang power plants, a proposed "Downtown South" resort by NTUC on Pulau Brani to thank workers, revitalisation of Sentosa's beaches, nature and heritage areas are to be expected.

On 6 June 2022, the Urban Redevelopment Authority (URA) announced that a 10-kilometre seafront promenade linking Marina Barrage to the Southern Ridges will be built as part of a longer coastal corridor from Marina Barrage to West Coast.

=== Heart of Yew Tee ===
Announced on 22 September 2019, Heart of Yew Tee will be an integrated development near Yew Tee MRT station consisting of a 10-storey residential block and a 6-storey commercial block, modeled after the award-winning Kampung Admiralty. It will house 68 two-room Flexi flats for seniors, a community club, a polyclinic, a kidney dialysis centre, and a hawker centre. Originally scheduled to open in the second half of 2026, it is now set to open in 2027.

=== Hotel Indigo Changi Airport ===
Announced by Changi Airport Group (CAG) on 26 April 2024, a new 255-room Hotel Indigo will be opened in 2028 at the newly refurbished Changi Airport Terminal 2. Situated above the existing coach stand, the hotel will be Singapore's first "zero-energy" hotel and be accessible from the departure hall via a link bridge.

The hotel will feature facilities such as a rooftop day club, infinity pool, and a bar. A floating forest spanning seven storeys is also one of the highlights of the upcoming landside hotel.

=== Integration of Bugis Village and Bugis Street ===
Announced on 16 January 2020, CapitaLand has won a three-year tender for the integrated management of Bugis Village and adjacent Bugis Street. Under the management, CapitaLand plans to revamp the area. Plans are being explored for the integrated development to house a day-to-night market, a retail incubator, and areas for co-living and co-working. A section will also be converted into a hub offering brands a space to innovate new ways of creating curated brand experiences or pilot new concepts.

A series of loose and colourful container boxes with open display areas is also being planned. To be named Bugis Box, it will be a modern interpretation of street markets with trendy bites, quirky gifts, and trending fashion accessories. It will be similar to South Korea's Common Ground.

There are also plans for a dining area for visitors to try out Singaporean and Southeast Asian hawker food. Diners will also be able to try making some dishes or purchase Singaporean food packs.

=== Jurong Lake District (JLD) ===
A new draft masterplan for the 120-hectare Jurong Lake District was unveiled on 25 August 2017, with new developments in the Lakeside district. It was planned to include a commercial centre around the high-speed rail station in Jurong East, and a third island crested through a new canal. It would be completed in two decades, and would be served by the upcoming Jurong Lake District MRT station on the Cross Island Line.

The Taman Jurong Skyline HDB project is being constructed on a 4.8 ha parcel of land once part of the former Tang Dynasty City. The project will consists of 1,844 residential units.

In July 2026, a 18.6 ha site between Jurong East and the future Jurong Lake District MRT stations was launched for sale. The site consists of at least 4.0 ha of dedicated office space and 4.4 ha of commercial and recreational space, and can accommodate up to 1,200 private residential units. A pedestrian network is also planned to directly connect the two MRT stations.

=== Newport Tower and Newport Residences (Redevelopment of Fuji Xerox Towers) ===
Vacated as of July 2021, the existing Fuji Xerox Towers will be demolished and redeveloped by City Developments Limited into a 45-storey mixed-use integrated development named Newport Plaza, Newport Tower, and Newport Residences. The development will house commercial space, offices, approximately 256 residences, and serviced apartments.

=== Pasir Panjang Power District ===
Housing two decommissioned power plants, oil and gas tanks, and ancillary buildings, the 15-hectare (37-acre) Pasir Panjang Power District, located next to the Labrador Nature Reserve, will be redeveloped as part of the Greater Southern Waterfront transformation plans. Some of the proposed ideas include a pair of towers built from old shipping containers, residences, hotels, events venue, gallery space, public park with courtyards, rooftop farms, and a theme park.

The district will be released for redevelopment through a tender in 2021.

=== The WAVES ===
Originally expected to be ready by end-2025, the WAVES was a planned 9,000 m^{2} (2.2 acres) integrated waterfront hub at the Greater Southern Waterfront. Aside from having berths for the public to view the testing and showcase of ships with green technology, the development would also house marine technology companies and feature a visitor sky terrace with food and beverage options.

=== Transformation of Orchard Road ===
Announced on 30 January 2019, the 2.4 km Orchard Road will be revamped and rejuvenated with unique experiences and offerings across four sub-precincts namely Tanglin, Orchard, Somerset, and Dhoby Ghaut. New retail concepts, attractions, events, and entertainment will be established to strengthen its position as a lifestyle destination. More trees and shrubs, with different colours for each sub-precincts will also be planted along both sides of the road.

Tanglin will primarily be an arts and artisanal mixed-use neighbourhood. For example, the conserved Tudor Court is planned to house more arts, cultural, and lifestyle offerings, while the covered canal is proposed to be turned into a courtyard for public art and outdoor dining. The neighbourhood will be mainly served by the Orchard Boulevard MRT station.

In Orchard, more mixed-use developments will be constructed on empty plots of land along Orchard Boulevard above Orchard MRT station. To enhance pedestrian connectivity, side streets will be redeveloped while elevated link bridges are planned to be built at the junctions of Orchard Road and Patterson Road.

Somerset will continue to be an energetic youth hub with new lifestyle options and the upcoming transformation of the 4,482-square-metre (48,240 sq ft) Grange Road carpark into a dedicated public events space for pop-up events and entertainment such as flea markets and food trucks. Amenities such as shower and changing room facilities will also be added at Skate Park and Youth Park, along with flexible spaces that can be reconfigured according to various events. The existing wall for graffiti in Youth Park will also be extended to become a larger canvas for street artists. Named Somerset Slopes, an area between Somerset Skate Park and 111 Somerset will be redeveloped into a new stage for buskers and activities such as movie nights. Different modular multi-storey working spaces for workshops, art studios, and incubator spaces will also be added as part of the new Incubation Nexus located adjacent Somerset Skate Park. Located at the Grange Road carpark, the 3,000-seater music hall managed by Live Nation is expected to open in 2026. Aside from a cafe and bar, there will also be a smaller 350-seater hall to cater to smaller acts.

Dhoby Ghaut will primarily be a lush greenery zone with attractions that are targeted at families. Parts of the road are planned to be converted to pedestrian use to connect existing green spaces at Istana Park and Dhoby Ghaut Green, while the current open space at Plaza Singapura will be transformed into a large garden with playgrounds and sheltered spaces for events. The 1.3-hectare (3.2-acre) Istana Park is proposed to be expanded and redesigned, featuring an orchid-themed garden and a rustic nature play garden with water play areas. This proposal would result in a realignment of Orchard Road from The Istana to SMA House. The Istana Park would also be better integrated with the Istana's entrance and commercial developments in its surrounding with roads that include use by pedestrians.

=== Union Square (Redevelopment of Central Mall and Central Square) ===
After the acquisition of Central Square at Havelock Road in 2022, City Developments Limited will be redeveloping Central Mall, Central Square, and an adjacent cluster of conservation shophouses into a large-scale mixed-use lifestyle hub comprising a hospitality component, serviced apartments, and commercial spaces such as offices and retail units.

Union Square will consist 366 apartments in a 40-storey residential tower, office and retail spaces in a 20-storey tower, and a 71-room three-storey hotel.

=== W Singapore - Marina View ===
Set to be Singapore's second W Hotels, the 350-room W Singapore - Marina View will be housed within a 51-storey mixed-use development in Marina Bay. The hotel is expected to be opened in 2028.

=== Redevelopment of Comcentre ===
On 23 February 2022, Singtel announced an over S$2 billion plan to redevelop Comcentre from 2024 into a pair of 20-storey buildings with a floor area of approximately 110,000 square metres. The buildings will be equipped with the latest digital technologies and sustainable features, as well as being well integrated into the surroundings with an underground connection to Somerset MRT station. Aside from a retail podium housing retail spaces and Singtel's new flagship store, the development will also feature an elevated rooftop park and an integrated wellness hub.

The new Comcentre will be developed in a joint venture with another developer that will be selected in May, although two were shortlisted earlier. Singtel will divest its stake to the joint venture company with a majority stake, although it will take up 30 per cent of the space as the anchor tenant. The new Comcentre will also be equipped with hybrid working spaces for other tenants. It will be completed by 2028, with Singtel working in other offices in the meantime.

=== Redevelopment of The Forum, voco Orchard, and HPL House ===
Announced by Hotel Properties Limited (HPL) Group on 28 August 2023, the existing Forum The Shopping Mall, voco Orchard Singapore hotel, and HPL House will be redeveloped into a new mega development with a mix of hotel, retail, office, and residential spaces. Located along the Orchard Road shopping belt, the new mixed-use development will include two towers of 64-storey and 43-storey above a 6-storey retail podium. A performance theatre, rooftop garden, and a separate 29-storey tower will also be built on the site.

=== Redevelopment of JCube and Jurong Regional Library ===
On 6 August 2023, JCube closed down to make way for a 40-storey residential development with commercial space on its lower levels. Jurong Regional Library will also be relocated within the site of the Jurong East Integrated Transport Hub near Jurong East MRT station in 2028.

The new mixed-use development, linked directly to the Jurong East MRT station and surrounding buildings via J-Walk, is expected to be completed in 2027.

=== Rejuvenation of Boon Lay Place ===
Announced on 4 August 2024, the commercial heart at Boon Lay Place will be redeveloped over the next few years. As part of the rejuvenation plans, the Boon Lay branch of the West Coast Town Council will be relocated to the former United Overseas Bank (UOB) building in 2025. More sheltered linkways and park connectors will also be built to enhance pedestrian experience. The Urban Redevelopment Authority is also currently studying long-term plans for the existing interim bus park, the former Savoy Theatre, and the ActiveSG Hockey Village.

=== Proposed waterfront hotel at River Valley ===
Released for sale on 5 December 2019, the 1.02-hectare (2.5-acre) hotel site located directly above Fort Canning MRT station can potentially yield a maximum of 530 hotel rooms. The site is envisioned to be developed into a distinctive waterfront landmark and offer seamless connections between the two attractions of Fort Canning Park and Singapore River.

=== Kembangan Wave ===
Announced by the Housing and Development Board (HDB) on 2 February 2024, an existing site adjacent to Kembangan MRT station is being developed into a HDB integrated development. The development will comprise approximately 340 Build-to-Order (BTO) split among two 18-storey buildings, and a five-storey commercial building housing an outpatient healthcare facility, a new Kampong Kembangan Community Club, supermarket, and retail shops.

As part of the redevelopment plan, the existing Kampong Kembangan Community Club will be temporarily relocated for a new neighbourhood park adjacent to the integrated development.

=== Proposed retail and office development at Punggol Central ===
Published by the Urban Redevelopment Authority (URA) on 21 October 2022, approximately 1-hectare of land adjacent to Punggol MRT station will be developed into a mixed-use office and retail development to provide more office spaces and retail options for the town's residents.

== Industrial ==
=== Jurong Innovation District (JID) ===
First announced in the 2016 Singapore Budget, the 600-hectare Jurong Innovation District (JID) aims to provide a conducive environment for startups and encourage innovation. To be developed by JTC, it will be located near NTU, Tengah and CleanTech Park, and the first phase will be completed by 2022. An elevated pathway stretching 11 kilometres, named Sky Corridor, will connect the JID's five precincts. An underground tunnel network for heavy vehicles, named District Logistics Network, is expected to be ready by 2024.

Tenants in the JID include, Hyundai Motor Group, Shimano Inc, Konica Minolta, Bosch Rexroth, and Siemens.

=== Punggol Digital District (PDD) ===
View from escalator at Singapore Institute of Technology, overlooking Campus Boulevard

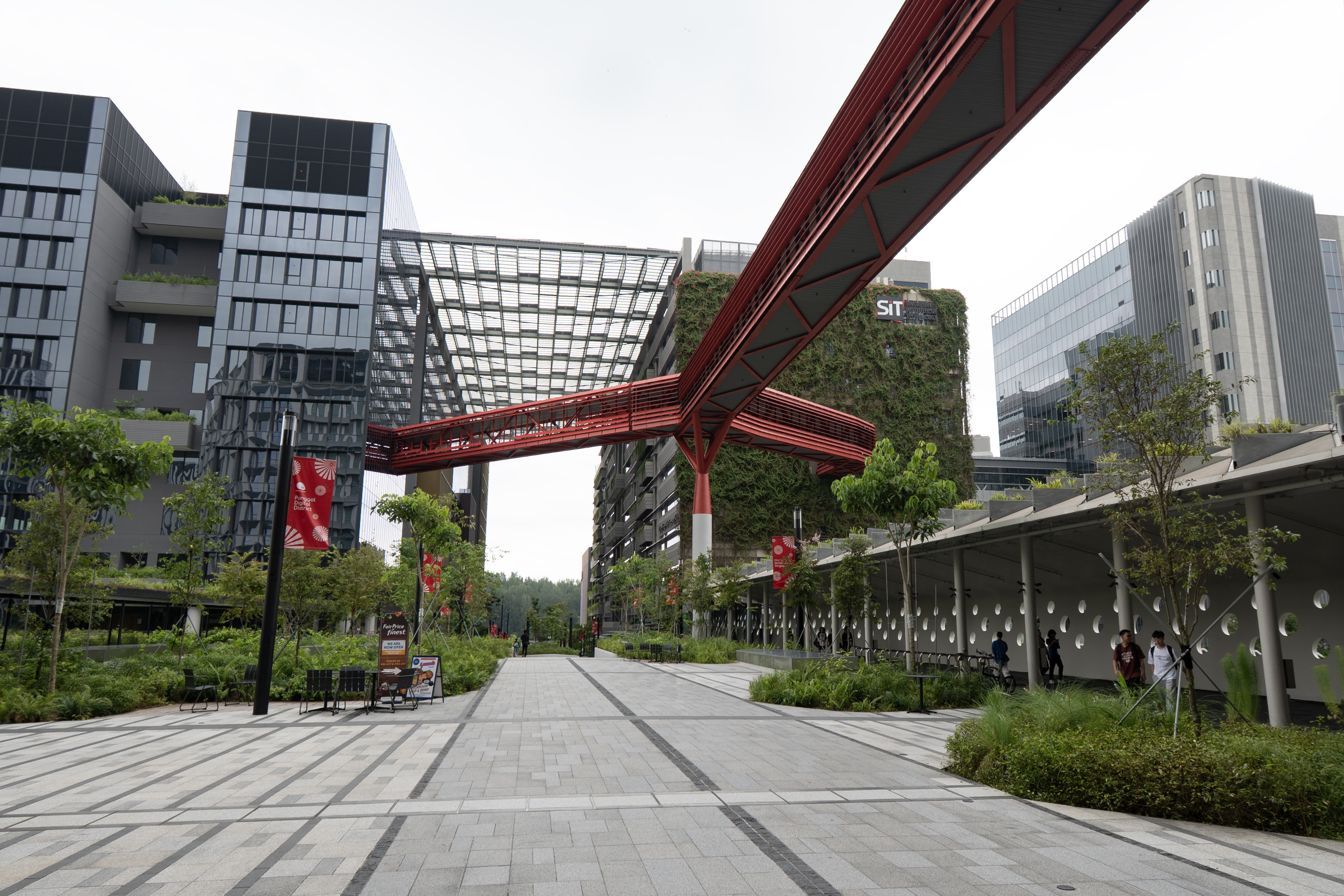
Punggol Digital District in September 2025.

First announced in the 2015 National Day Rally and 2017 Singapore Budget, the 50-hectare (120-acre) Punggol Digital District (PDD) will be Singapore's first enterprise district, with JTC being the master developer. Located in Punggol North, it will house a business park comprising digital and cybersecurity industries, as well as the Singapore Institute of Technology (SIT) new permanent campus in Punggol. It will create approximately 28,000 new jobs and offer Punggol residents additional dining, leisure, and retail spots. The first phase of the district, spanning 21 hectares, will be opening in phases from September 2024.

=== Sungei Kadut Eco-District (SKED) ===
Announced on 6 February 2020, the existing Sungei Kadut Industrial Estate will be developed and transformed in phases, forming the overall 500-hectare Sungei Kadut Eco-District (SKED). Other than traditional manufacturing industries, the district will also house new sectors such as agri-tech and environmental technology. The district will be split into four primary precincts namely Sungei Kadut North, Sungei Kadut Central, Sungei Kadut South, and the Agri-Food Innovation Park.

The district will have nature and heritage trails as well as a park network with lush greenery connecting to waterfront parks and existing park connectors. Co-working and co-living spaces, together with leisure amenities will also be built to attract the general public to visit during after-work hours and on weekends. Iconic old buildings are expected to be refurbished and repurposed into art and lifestyle hubs housing retail and recreational facilities. Farm-to-fork cafes, farmers' markets, live performances, and pop-up markets will also be present to transform the district into a lifestyle destination for the wider community.

The district will be served by new roads and the future Sungei Kadut MRT station. A mobility corridor specially for public buses, cyclists, and pedestrians will also be built.

As part of the first phase, the 18-hectare (44-acre) Agri-Food Innovation Park will house high-tech farming and R&D activities, such as indoor farming and aquaculture hatcheries. In total, more than 40 hectares (99 acres) of new facilities and infrastructure is scheduled to be completed by 2025 as part of SKED's first phase.

=== Dover Knowledge District ===
As part of the Draft Master Plan 2019 by the Urban Redevelopment Authority (URA), the future Dover Knowledge District will be a mixed-use site meant to be an extension to the existing one-north district.

=== Lim Chu Kang Agri-Food Cluster ===
Announced on 2 October 2020 by the Singapore Food Agency (SFA), Lim Chu Kang is planned to be redeveloped into a 390-hectare (960-acre) high-tech agri-food cluster. Shared facilities will be developed to lower production costs and the use of resources. Aside from the core agri-food production, relevant activities such as farmers' markets and education tours are also currently under consideration.

Development of the site was originally scheduled to be carried out in phases starting from 2024. When completed, the cluster will have the capabilities to produce more than three times its current food production.

=== Changi City ===
A designated area in Changi East adjacent to Singapore Changi Airport, Changi City is planned to be a lifestyle business cluster made up of the existing Singapore University of Technology and Design (SUTD) and Changi Business Park, as well as the future Changi East Urban District. It will be a major waterfront district with recreational and tourism facilities/amenities while offering seamless "fly-ferry" connections between Changi Airport Terminal 5 and Tanah Merah Ferry Terminal due to their close proximity to one another.

The future Changi East Urban District, situated between the upcoming Changi Airport Terminal 5 and the existing Tanah Merah Ferry Terminal, will house offices, smart work centres, conference rooms and halls, hotels, and serviced apartments in landscaped public spaces.

=== JTC aeroSpace Four ===
Expected to be completed by 2027, JTC aeroSpace Four will expand the industrial space in Seletar Aerospace Park by 11,000 square meters along with 25% more standard-sized factory units.

This is after the completion of the third phase in 2022 which consists of nine new buildings built in the industrial park.

=== Tuas Nexus ===
Currently under construction at a site next to the Tuas Water Reclamation Plant in Tuas View Basin, Tuas Nexus is an integrated waste management facility. It will be the first in Singapore to treat both used water and food waste in the same plant to produce biogas for electricity generation. The facility will be entirely energy self-sufficient with the use of renewable energy sources such as solar panels and the conversion of heat produced by the incinerators to electricity. Excess electricity generated will be exported back to the national grid, sufficient to power up to 300,000 homes.

Tuas Nexus will also help to expand the lifespan of Semakau Landfill as it allows incineration bottom ash to be extracted from waste.

The first phase of the facility is targeted to be completed by 2024.

=== AstraZeneca Singapore ===
Announced on 20 May 2024, British biopharmaceutical giant AstraZeneca will be constructing a next-generation manufacturing facility costing S$2 billion. The facility will be designed to manufacture antibody drug conjugates (ADC) for targeted cancer treatment.

The smart and sustainable facility, with its location unannounced, is expected to be ready by 2029.

=== Expansion of Apple Ang Mo Kio Campus ===
Announced by Apple on 17 April 2024, the existing campus in Ang Mo Kio will undergo a more than S$340 million expansion from late-2024. Two acquired buildings located across the main regional operations centre will be revamped to cater to its expanding workforce and newly added roles in the country. Once completed, the campus will solely be running on renewable energy.

=== Refurbishment of wafer fabrication parks ===
Announced on 1 November 2019, JTC will be refurbishing its four existing wafer fabrication parks in Pasir Ris, Tampines, Woodlands, and North Coast. The improvements include sheltered walkways, cycling paths, additional trees by the roadside, and more lifestyle amenities.

Enhancement works for all four parks are expected to be completed by 2025.

=== Northern Tuas Basin Reclamation ===
Scheduled to begin in phases from 2025 and be fully completed by 2029, reclamation works near the Northern Tuas Basin carried out by JTC Corporation will provide additional 172 hectares of industrial land and improve network connections to the upcoming Tuas South and Tuas Port.

=== Redevelopment of Defu Industrial Estate (Defu Industrial Park) ===
Identified by the Government for redevelopment in 2012, Defu Industrial Estate will be transformed over the next 15 to 20 years along the vision of "A Green and Sustainable Industrial Park of Tomorrow". The redeveloped industrial park will be renamed Defu Industrial Park. Existing factories will be progressively replaced with newer and more modern industrial complexes, with the entire industry park featuring landscaped greenery and environmentally sustainable features.

Defu Industrial Park will be split into three key zones. The Northern and Central Zone will house strategic industries such as logistics, precision engineering, info-communications and media, electronics, clean energy and biomedical, while the Southern Zone will be set aside for new modern industrial complexes to house the existing industrial enterprises.

The redevelopment will be carried out in three phases with Phase 1 nearing completion. 219 factories out of the existing 1,046 factories, will be relocated to two new complexes that are nearing completion. Bedok Food City will house the factories that are in the food industry, while Defu Industrial City will house factories in the general industries.

The total amount of factory floor space of the new industry park will be increased to 2.1 million square-metre.

== Residential ==
=== Bayshore ===
First announced on 16 October 2017, the new 60-hectare Bayshore district, located adjacent to East Coast Park, will comprise more than 10,000 Housing and Development Board (HDB) and private residential units. A 1 km public transit street will run through the district, lined with green spaces, shops, and amenities. The district will also feature an integrated transport hub at Bedok South MRT station. A new linear park will also be built along the heritage seawalls with a new sea pavilion.

The district will be launched for development after 2024, when Bayshore MRT station and Bedok South MRT station are operational.

=== Berlayer ===
As part of the Greater Southern Waterfront plan, the 48 ha (120 acres) Keppel Club site will be redeveloped into a prime waterfront residential district. The existing private golf club will be replaced by approximately 9,000 Housing and Development Board (HDB) and private residential units when its lease expires in 2021. Public housing units in the prime area will use a new pricing model to lessen the effect where owners sell their units at much higher prices than initially purchased at subsidised rates from the Housing and Development Board (HDB).

On 12 April 2022, it was announced that 6,000 HDB flats will be built on the former Keppel Club site as part of the new Berlayer estate. An additional 1,000 flats were announced on 23 September 2025. The site will also include 3,000 private units. The site's first BTO project, Berlayer Residences, was launched in October 2025.

=== Chencharu ===
Announced in August 2022, ORTO leisure park and Ground-Up Initiative will have to vacate their current premises at Lorong Chencharu by June 2023 to make way for new housing developments. Located near Khatib MRT station, the nearly 70 ha (170 acres) Chencharu area was identified by the URA as part of Yishun's long-term land use plans. The future residential precinct is planned to house approximately 10,000 residential units by 2040, with majority of it being public flats.

The official masterplan for the new neighbourhood was unveiled by the Housing and Development Board (HDB) on 12 June 2024. Aside from residential flats, an integrated development housing a new bus interchange, hawker centre, and shops will be built. An educational institution and nursing home will also be part of the new Chencharu estate. To improve connectivity, a bus-only corridor will run from the north to the south of the new estate. The existing Ground-Up Initiative and Live Turtle and Tortoise Museum will be relocated to a site beside HomeTeamNS Khatib.

An approximately century-old colonial-era bungalow located within the area is set to be preserved and integrated as part of the new residential area where it will sit atop a hill in the new neighbourhood park. A footpath will connect the new park to the existing neighbourhood park beside Khatib MRT station.

The estate was launched in 2024 with its first Build-to-Order (BTO) housing project named Chencharu Hills.

=== Dakota Crescent ===
To be redeveloped into a mixed-use precinct, the existing Dakota Crescent area will be largely revitalised with new public housing developments planned around six preserved Singapore Improvement Trust (SIT) blocks and the iconic dove playground that were built in the 1950s. Although not formally gazetted for conservation, the central cluster of SIT-built blocks will be retained and repurposed for civic and community uses due to their historical significance as one of Singapore's first public housing projects built before the formation of the current Housing and Development Board (HDB).

All residents previously residing in the 17 low-rise SIT blocks have vacated in 2017.

In February 2022, the first Build-to-Order (BTO) housing project, Dakota Crest, located in the former site of the low-rise flats was launched.

=== Dover Forest ===
Announced by the Housing and Development Board (HDB) on 30 July 2021, the revised development plan for the 33-hectare (82-acre) Dover Forest, located in Queenstown, will see the approximately 11-hectare eastern half of the forest be developed for public housing while the western half of the forest will be temporarily preserved due to its rich biodiversity.

The eastern half of the forest will feature five hectares of greenery, including a park with a natural stream. Also, housing blocks will be designed to take into consideration the existing Ulu Pandan canal, which will be upgraded. For example, blocks nearer to the canal will be lower than the rest of the development to achieve a tiered effect and maximise views of the canal. A commercial development housing amenities will be built near Dover MRT station to provide a link between the station and the developed area.

Plans for the western half of the forest will be reviewed in 2030 when further development is required. However, a portion of it will be safeguarded as a nature park.

In addition, as Singapore's first car-lite HDB precinct, the new estate will see roads placed only along its perimeter, away from pedestrian walkways and cycling paths.

The estate was launched in 2022 with its first Build-to-Order (BTO) housing project named Ulu Pandan Banks.

=== Farrer Park ===
Announced on 25 April 2022, a 10-hectare (25-acre) site in Farrer Park is set to be developed into a public housing estate with approximately 1,600 Housing and Development Board (HDB) flats integrated with sports and recreational facilities to preserve and highlight the sporting heritage of the area. Approximately 20 per cent of the site will be reserved as open spaces, including a 1.2-hectare (3.0-acre) central green space with a field and a park. To be integrated within one of the housing developments, the existing Farrer Park Boxing Gym will be retained and repurposed into a multi-purpose community sporting space for residents residing in the estate. However, due to technical and cost considerations and difficulties, the existing Farrer Park Swimming Complex will not be retained but replaced with a new sporting centre housing sports facilities such as swimming pools. The new estate will also feature sports facilities integrated within a multi-storey car park, a jogging track connecting the various facilities in the estate, and commercial and social amenities such as retail shops and a childcare centre.

The estate was launched in 2023 with its first Build-to-Order (BTO) housing project named Farrer Park Fields.

=== Fernvale North ===
An 18.9 ha (47 acres) site in Fernvale North, Sengkang, will house approximately 10,000 new public and private residential units when fully completed. A park, place of worship, and a medical care facility will also be part of the new precinct. The first housing project, Fernvale Oasis, was launched in October 2024.

=== Gillman Barracks ===
Announced in 2024, Gillman Barracks, a former colonial military barracks, is planned for redevelopment as a residential estate. 25 of the existing buildings will be retained. One-fifth of the 40 ha (99 acres) site will be green spaces, preserving some of the vegetation.

=== Holland Plain ===
Announced on 16 October 2017, Holland Plain is an upcoming 34-hectare precinct which will comprise approximately 2,500 private residential units. The precinct is located near King Albert Park MRT station and the Rail Corridor. More than 30 per cent of the area will feature lush greenery including a wetland park and community plain. Sky-rise greenery and green routes are also being planned for the district.

The precinct will begin to be developed from 2021.

=== Kampong Bugis ===
Announced during the 2017 Budget, Kampong Bugis is a new waterfront development zone in Singapore, which will be given to a master developer, giving flexibility in planning the town layouts as opposed to carving each land plot by itself. The area will comprise approximately 4,000 private residential units, primarily served by Lavender MRT station, Kallang MRT station, and Bendemeer MRT station. Kallang Riverside Park will also be redeveloped into a waterfront park as part of the plan.

=== Lentor Hills ===
First announced as part of the URA Master Plan 2014, the existing 30 ha (74 acres) forest bordering Teacher's Estate will be cleared for the development of private homes. Located near Lentor MRT station, the new neighbourhood is planned around the existing hillock. Two green plots of the existing forests will be kept, along with new parks such as a linear park and the main Hillock Park.

Lentor Modern, a mixed-use development with retail amenities above Lentor MRT station, was opened in January 2026. Teacher's Estate Park, an 8 ha (20 acres) park linking the Central Catchment Nature Reserve to Khatib Nature Corridor, is being constructed off Tagore Road.

=== Long Island ===
First envisioned in the 1991 Concept Plan as a reclaimed island for housing and leisure off the current east coast of Singapore, from Marina East to Changi, the URA announced on 6 June 2022 that Long Island could be developed for housing integrated with coastal parks and spaces for recreation. A reservoir and floodplains to protect the nation's coastline from rising sea levels are also in the development's long-term plans.

=== Marina South ===
First announced as part of the URA Master Plan 2014, the future 21.5-hectare Marina South precinct will house over 9,000 private residential units built next to Gardens by the Bay. The precinct is envisioned to be a car-lite and pedestrian-friendly neighbourhood. Retail shops and community facilities/amenities will be located at street level, followed by residences above, for increased convenience.

Major arterial roads in the area will also be realigned to create "wind corridors" where winds during the monsoon seasons will be funneled into the area. Future buildings in the precinct will also feature varying heights to channel air downwards to the surface. Each building will also be located further apart for better ventilation. All of these would facilitate better wind flow, resulting in a lower ambient temperature and comfort for those in the precinct.

On 12 January 2022, it was announced that the upcoming Marina South MRT station on the Thomson-East Coast MRT line will remain closed until surrounding housing developments are completed.

=== Miltonia Close ===
Currently under development, the upcoming Miltonia Close estate in Yishun will comprise public and private housing developments. A 6.4-hectare nature park with a natural stream will also be part of the estate.

The estate was launched in 2022 with its first Build-to-Order (BTO) housing projects: Aranda Breeze @ Yishun, Miltonia Breeze @ Yishun, and Vanda Breeze @ Yishun.

=== Mount Pleasant ===
Announced on 23 November 2021, approximately 5,000 Housing and Development Board (HDB) flats will be built on the Old Police Academy site in Mount Pleasant. Part of the Singapore Polo Club will also be acquired as part of the development. The design of the 33-hectare (82-acre) estate will be inspired by the nature and heritage in the 1920s-developed area. Heritage elements from the old academy, surrounding greenery, and pre-war colonial bungalows will be integrated into the design of the new estate. Four existing Old Police Academy buildings and a part of the parade square will be retained and refreshed into community spaces. Surrounded by residential blocks with sky and roof gardens, a low-rise neighbourhood centre, designed to be open and green, will house amenities such as retail units.

The estate will have six housing projects, totalling about 5,000 homes. The first project, Mount Pleasant Crest, was launched in October 2025. The completed Mount Pleasant MRT station on the Thomson–East Coast Line will remain closed until surrounding housing developments are opened.

=== Pang Sua Woodland ===
Located in Choa Chu Kang, the existing 15-hectare Pang Sua Woodland is part of an approximately 22-hectare site to be developed with high-density residential developments integrated with the nearby Rail Corridor and Pang Sua Canal. A key recommendation of establishing a green corridor within the site to preserve the ecological links to surrounding nature areas was published for public feedback on 5 April 2022 by the Housing and Development Board (HDB) as part of an environmental study for the development of the area.

Following the environmental study and public feedback, HDB published the redevelopment's revised plans on 6 July 2022. Aside from healthy and mature tree clusters within the sitre, at least two hectares of the existing woodland along the existing Pang Sua Canal will also be preserved. The original alignment of the Rail Corridor will also be retained as much as possible as part of the redevelopment.

The estate was launched in 2023 with its first Build-to-Order (BTO) housing projects: Rail Green I, and Rail Green II @ CCK.

=== Singapore Science Park ===
In May 2024, a site next to the upcoming Geneo development in Singapore Science Park was announced to be developed into a 300-unit condominium by CapitaLand Development, making it the first residential development in the precinct. The project was formally announced in June 2025 as LyndenWoods, a 343-unit condominium to be completed by the end of June 2029.

=== Springleaf ===
Announced by the URA on 6 June 2022, portions of Springleaf will be developed as a mixed-use site with residential and commercial developments surrounding Springleaf MRT station. Planned residences to be built on the site will be private developments. Aside from having small footprints to minimise loss of habitat, upcoming buildings will also feature greener facades to avoid colliding with birds.

Spanning more than 30-hectares, the site will retain some natural and heritage elements such as the former Seletar Institute and Nee Soon Post Office. Approximately half of the site will be a new park named Nee Soon Nature Park to act as a buffer and extension of the nearby Central Catachment Nature Reserve and an ecological link with the Khatib Bongsu Nature Park that is set to open in the near future. The existing Sungei Selatar will also be retained and integrated into the new park containing a rare freshwater swamp forest habitat.

=== Tampines North ===
First announced on 29 August 2013, Tampines North is a new 240-hectare residential estate in the existing Tampines town. It consists of four housing zones namely Park West District, Green Walk District, Park East District, and Boulevard District. When fully developed, the estate will house 21,000 housing units of which 17,000 units will be Housing and Development Board (HDB) units. Apart from small-scale neighbourhood park spaces, there will also be two major parks in the estate. Boulevard Park will run through the entire estate, connecting residents from Sun Plaza Park to Sungei Api Api, while Quary Park will feature a sand quarry pond, inspired by the town's history. A landmark bridge will be built to link Quarry Park to Sun Plaza Park and Boulevard Park, seamlessly integrating the new estate into the existing town.

The estate will also house a mixed-use development integrated with a new bus interchange. Aside from the new bus interchange, the estate will also be served by the future Tampines North MRT station.

The estate was launched in 2014 with its first Build-to-Order (BTO) housing project named Tampines GreenRidges.

=== Tanglin Halt ===
One of Singapore's oldest housing estates, the Tanglin Halt estate in Queenstown will be redeveloped over the next ten to fifteen years with 5,500 new Housing and Development Board (HDB) flats. Located on the site of the former neighbourhood centre, a 40-storey integrated development will house retail shops, a new hawker centre, and a market. The existing Queenstown Polyclinic will also be relocated to the integrated development.

Aside from a new park within the estate, landscaping and recreational facilities will be built along the estate's Rail Corridor stretch.

The redevelopment plan was launched in 2023 with its first Build-to-Order (BTO) housing project named Tanglin Halt Cascadia.

=== Tanjong Rhu ===
Unveiled by the Urban Redevelopment Authority (URA) on 25 August 2023, existing residential land plots in Tanjong Rhu have been re-parcelled and re-ratioed into three plots totaling 12 hectares. The land plots are able to cater over 5,000 new residential units. There are also plans to widen nearby roads to meet the increase traffic contributed by the new homes in the area. A new park by the Geylang River will be built in between two of the plots.

As it has been more than a decade since the last launch of new homes in the area, the three land plots will be able to support housing demand in Tanjong Rhu.

The first two plots were launched in 2024 with the first Build-to-Order (BTO) housing project named Tanjong Rhu Riverfront I and II.

=== Tengah New Town ===
The Tengah New Town is a 700ha development that will integrate nature in it. It will feature five development zones, each with its own unique identity. It was announced on 8 September 2016, with the first units to be released in 2018. The town could potentially yield up to 42,000 new homes, with more than 70 per cent of the units allocated for public housing, which would take up to two decades to complete. Tengah would feature a car-free town centre; the first in Singapore, and will be served by the future Jurong Region Line. Plantation, the first district out of five, was unveiled on 4 September 2018. The district pays homage to the farmers who resided there back in the 1950s. The first flats were launched on 13 November 2018.

=== Toa Payoh West ===
Development plans for the western part of Toa Payoh were unveiled in October 2026. The new neighbourhood will consist of 6,000 homes, with park spaces forming a "central green valley", a shopping mall and a school, all of which will be connected to Caldecott MRT station on the Circle Line and Thomson–East Coast Line. The first housing project, Toa Payoh Hillside, will be launched in November 2026.

=== Population White Paper: Land Use Plan 2030 ===
In 2013, the Singaporean government announced a new development plan, "Singapore 2030", for Singapore, designed to accommodate the growing population. It is assumed that the population will reach between 6.5 and 6.9 million by 2030. Singapore will increase its land area to 766 km^{2} (296 sq mi) square kilometres through land reclamation from the sea. Most of the reclamation will be done at Tekong and Tuas islands, with additional reclamation points beyond 2030 including Marina East, Changi East, and Pasir Ris. Singapore 2030 is part of the Land Use Plan to develop the mostly parts such as Tampines North (expansion), Tengah and Bidadari. There are ongoing projects such as 100,000 HDB flats to be built until 2030, followed by Bukit Brown, and somehow post-2030 plans will consist of Paya Lebar Airbase and Southern Waterfront City. High-density towns with a full range of amenities such as childcare centers, hospitals, and recreational areas will be built. About 60% of Singapore's land will be set aside for housing, industry, and community facilities, up from 52%. In addition, 700,000 new housing units will be built, the size of the rail network will be doubled, and some golf courses and military training grounds will make way for redevelopment. According to the plans, 85% of Singaporeans will live close to a park.

=== Former New Town Primary and Secondary School campus ===
Located beside Commonwealth MRT station, the 7.6-hectare site housing the former New Town Primary and Secondary Schools will be redeveloped for housing.

=== Former Raffles Junior College campus ===
Located in Mount Sinai, near Buona Vista MRT station, the former Raffles Junior College (RJC) campus was demolished to make way for new developments such as housing, amenities, a school, and retail facilities. The site will be directly connected to the Rail Corridor through new pedestrian links.

== Transport ==
=== Bus depots ===
Five bus depots are currently under construction: Kim Chuan Bus Depot, Lorong Halus Bus Depot, Pasir Panjang Bus Depot, Simpang Bus Depot, and Tengah Depot

Lorong Halus Bus Depot is located along Serangoon River Road in Lorong Halus, Hougang. Occupying a 6 ha (15 acres) site, it will be a four-storey depot housing up to 550 buses. The depot will be completed by 2030 and will replace an existing bus depot.

Pasir Panjang Bus Depot is located in Pasir Panjang Distripark in Pasir Panjang, Queenstown. With a capacity of over 500 buses, the depot will house a seven-storey building fitted with electric bus chargers and solar panels, workers' quarters, and other ancillary buildings. The depot will be completed by 2029.

Simpang Bus Depot is located along Yishun Avenue 8 in Yishun, sitting on a 5.6 ha (14 acres) site opposite Yishun Industrial Park. Designed to house 500 buses, the depot consists of a four-storey main building, transport workers' quarters, and ancillary buildings. The depot will be completed by 2029 and will replace an existing bus depot.

=== Changi Airport Terminal 5 ===
Terminal 5 is set to be ready by the mid-2030s. It is expected to handle 150 million passenger movements per year, up from the current 82 million. The airport terminal structure is projected to be larger than all the previous terminals combined. It will be built on reclaimed land to the east of the present terminals. After construction delays of 2 years due to the COVID-19 pandemic, work resumed in 2022 with the new terminal having broken ground on 14 May 2025.

An underground link housing an automated people-mover system and a baggage handling system will be built to connect Terminal 5 with the existing Terminal 2 building 2.5 km away. Aside from future stations on the Thomson-East Coast Line and Cross Island Line, Terminal 5 will also be direct connected to the existing Tanah Merah Ferry Terminal, boosting its transport connections.

=== Changi Northern and Southern Corridor ===
A two-part infrastructure project near Changi Airport designed to complement the upcoming Cross Island Line and Changi Airport Terminal 5, the Changi Northern and Southern Corridor includes the widening of existing roads and the construction of new roads, viaducts, and cycling paths. Land acquisitions affecting parts of the Laguna National Golf and Country Club and three JTC Corporation plots will also take place as part of the Changi Southern Corridor construction.

The Changi Northern Corridor consists of a new viaduct being built along Loyang Avenue, between Tampines Expressway and Loyang Way. It will be lined with noise barriers to reduce noise impact on nearby residential homes. Loyang Avenue will also have new bus lanes as well as cycling paths along the surrounding roads connected to the existing Park Connector Network. The Changi Northern Corridor will be completed in 2028.

The Changi Southern Corridor consists of new roads that will connect Changi Airport Terminal 5 to the East Coast Parkway and a widened and realigned Tanah Merah Coast Road. Existing roads such as the Pan Island Expressway will also be widened, while two flyovers will be reconfigured. New cycling paths will also be added. Works for the Changi Southern Corridor project will begin in 2026, and be completed in 2034.

=== Cross Island Line (CRL) ===
The CRL is an upcoming 50 km (31 mi) line spanning across Singapore. Phase 1 of the CRL will be completed by 2030, spanning 29 km (18 miles) across Changi, Loyang, Pasir Ris, Defu, Hougang, Ang Mo Kio and Bishan with 12 stations. Phase 2, consisting of 6 stations, will be completed by 2032.

A 7.3 km (4.5 miles) extension to Punggol will also be completed by 2032, consisting of four stations: Punggol, Riviera, Elias, and Pasir Ris.

=== Downtown Line extensions ===
To be opened on 26 December 2026, the Downtown Line 3 Extension (DTL3e) will run from Expo through the east coast area, to Sungei Bedok. The extension will see the addition of two new stations: Xilin and Sungei Bedok, with the latter being an interchange with the Thomson–East Coast Line.

At the western end, the Downtown Line 2 Extension (DTL2e) will extend the line from Bukit Panjang to Sungei Kadut, and interchange with the North–South Line. The extension includes an unnamed station at Gali Batu, and is scheduled to be completed by 2035.

=== Expansion of Sengkang Depot ===
Announced by the Land Transport Authority on 5 February 2021, Sengkang Depot, specifically the depot for the Sengkang and Punggol LRT lines, will be expanded from 3.5 hectares (8.6 acres) to 11.1 hectares (27 acres) to cater for the upcoming fleet expansion of both LRT lines. Situated above the North East MRT line's depot, the expansion will include a new train stabling area, a maintenance workshop, and three new traction power stations. Two reception tracks will also be built to shorten the train launching time.

Construction began in end-2022 and is scheduled to be completed by 2027.

=== Integrated Transport Hubs ===
The upcoming Jurong East Integrated Transport Hub (ITH) will house community and civic institutions, a 27-storey office tower, and the new Jurong East Bus Interchange. It will also feature a 90-metre sky bridge above the existing train viaducts, connecting the office tower to an 8-storey podium block. Situated at Jurong East MRT station, the integrated transport hub will provide direct connectivity and more convenient transfers between the North–South Line, East–West Line, and the upcoming Jurong Region Line. The ITH is scheduled to be completed by 2027.

ITHs at Beauty World, Hougang, Kallang and Tampines North are also under construction.

Additional ITHs were announced in 2019 as part of the Land Transport Master Plan 2040. Locations of planned ITHs include Bedok South, Marina South and Tengah. Other planned locations announced include Choa Chu Kang, Tampines, Turf City and Bishan.

=== Johor Bahru–Singapore Rapid Transit System (RTS) ===
The Johor Bahru–Singapore RTS is an upcoming 4 km cross-border light-rail link between Bukit Changar in Johor Bahru and Woodlands North MRT station in Singapore. It will transport approximately 10,000 passengers per hour each way to ease traffic on the already-congested Causeway. Facilities for customs, immigration and quarantine (CIQ) will be co-located, where passengers will only be required to undergo border clearance once, during departure.

Initially planned to be integrated with the Thomson–East Coast Line (TEL) and share its depot at Mandai, the RTS Link will instead be its own independent light-rail system with a designated depot in Johor Bahru.

Construction of the RTS Link Woodlands North station begun on 22 January 2021. The underground station will feature a link to the CIQ building and connect to the existing Woodlands North MRT station on the TEL. The line is expected to begin operation in January 2027, replacing the current KTM Shuttle Tebrau train service between the two countries.

=== Jurong Region Line (JRL) ===
Previously proposed as an LRT line, the JRL was re-proposed into a fully elevated 24 km (15 mi) long MRT line with 24 stations. It will be the seventh line to be built with completion in 3 stages from mid-2028 to 2029. It will serve West Coast, Tengah and Choa Chu Kang, besides just Jurong when originally announced in 2001.

The West Coast extension will extend the JRL from Pandan Reservoir to West Coast on the Cross Island Line in the late 2030s, and subsequently to Kent Ridge on the Circle Line in the early 2040s.

=== Kuala Lumpur–Singapore high-speed rail ===
A proposed high-speed rail line will link Singapore at Jurong East to Kuala Lumpur within a 90-minute train ride. Originally planned to be completed by 2026, the project was cancelled in January 2021. However, since November 2021, plans to revive the project had been discussed. As of October 2025, no decision has been made on the project's revival.

=== North–South Corridor (NSC) ===
The 21.5 km (13.4 mi) North–South Corridor will stretch from Woodlands and Sembawang to the western end of the East Coast Parkway, relieving traffic on the congested Central Expressway. It will be the 11th of Singapore's expressways. Construction commenced in 2017, and is slated to be completed by 2027. The Land Transport Authority announced that the NSC will be transformed to Singapore's first integrated transport corridor featuring continuous bus lanes and cycling trunk routes, throughout the length of the route.

On 27 August 2024, the Land Transport Authority revealed early proposed plans for the surface streets along the North-South Corridor. Plans include a public space at the intersection of Rochor Canal Road, Sungei Road, and Jalan Besar to connect and better enhance walking, cycling, and riding experiences at nearby educational institutions and the three main cultural districts of Little India, Kampong Glam, and Waterloo Street. A stretch of Ophir Road may also be pedestrianised to allow heritage and cultural events to take place while connecting Kampong Glam with the larger Bugis district. These are part of the 3.5 km cultural-heritage segment of the corridor. The other three segments are, a 6 km community-industrial segment, a 7 km ecological loop, and a 5 km corridor focusing on wellness. These four segments will house more than twenty public spaces that reflect the characteristics of the nearby neighbourhoods.

=== North–South Line infill stations ===
Announced on 25 May 2019 as part of the Land Transport Master Plan 2040, two infill stations will be added on the North–South Line. Brickland station, to be located between Choa Chu Kang and Bukit Gombak stations, will serve future residents in Tengah's Brickland estate and Bukit Gombak. Sungei Kadut station, to be located between Yew Tee and Kranji stations, will serve the upcoming Sungei Kadut Eco-District. The new stations are scheduled to open in 2034 and 2035, respectively.

=== PIE Cycling Link ===
Announced by the Urban Redevelopment Authority in October 2023, a cycling bridge over the Pan Island Expressway (PIE) will be built near St Andrew's Junior College. Set to be Singapore's longest elevated cycling bridge, the 682 m (746 yd) bridge is part of the Bishan-to-city cycling route to reduce commuting time for cyclists to the city. It will feature resting areas and wheelchair-accessible lifts on both sides.

The bridge reached 50% completion in July 2026 and is expected to be completed in the second half of 2027.

=== Seletar Line and Tengah Line ===
Announced on 25 May 2019 as part of the Land Transport Master Plan 2040, a new MRT line tentatively known as Seletar Line is currently under study. It is planned to run between Woodlands and the Greater Southern Waterfront, serving parts of Sembawang, Sengkang, Serangoon North, Whampoa, and Kallang along the way.

During the Ministry of Transport’s Committee of Supply (COS) Debate 2025, it was revealed that another MRT line tentatively known as Tengah Line is also being studied. The line could serve Tengah, Bukit Batok, Queensway, and Bukit Merah.

The proposed Seletar Line and Tengah Line may be combined into a single line at the Greater Southern Waterfront.

=== Tampines Walking and Cycling Town ===
After Ang Mo Kio, Tampines will be the second walking and cycling town in Singapore when works to improve the town's infrastructure are completed. The total length of cycling paths in Tampines will be three times more than the current length. Furthermore, footpaths will be widened and roads will be redesigned and rebuilt. The existing cycling paths in the town will also be widened, while existing bicycle crossings will have additional signs and markings. All of these aim to make walking and cycling within the town safer and more convenient.

A new project by the Land Transport Authority (LTA) was launched in July 2022 to add another 8 km (5.0 mi) of cycling paths in Tampines to better connect its residents to the town centre. This includes a cycling bridge over the Tampines Expressway (TPE) to connect Tampines and Pasir Ris, and a cycling underpass to connect Tampines and Simei. As of February 2025, at least 30 km (19 mi) of cycling paths have been constructed. By 2027, another 7.7 km (4.8 mi) of cycling paths, the bridge to Pasir Ris and the underpass to Simei will bring the town's total cycling path network to 40 km (25 mi).

=== Thomson–East Coast Line ===
The sixth Mass Rapid Transit and fourth fully driverless line in Singapore, the TEL is a 43 km (27 mi) long fully underground line. The first four stages of the line opened between 2020 and 2024. Stage 5, comprising Bedok South and Sungei Bedok stations, will open on 26 December 2026. The TEL will add greatly to the accessibility and connectivity of the current rail network, with interchanges to all other five MRT lines.

Plans to extend the Thomson-East Coast Line (TEL) to the future Changi Airport Terminal 5 were announced in 2019 as part of the Land Transport Master Plan 2040. The Changi Airport branch of the East–West Line will also be converted and linked up to the Thomson-East Coast Line Extension (TELe). The extension is scheduled to be completed by the mid-2030s. Preparation works for station conversion began in 2025.

=== Transit Priority Corridors ===
As part of the Land Transport Master Plan 2040 announced on 25 May 2019, additional Transit Priority Corridors (TPCs) are being implemented, which will provide bus and cycling infrastructure with the aim of reducing transportation time for public transit users and cyclists. Besides the under-construction North–South Corridor, areas under study include Robinson Road, Loyang, Jurong Lake District, and Woodlands North Coast.

=== Tuas Mega Port ===
The S$20 billion Tuas Mega Port started its first phase of construction in 2016, with the second phase in 2019. To be opened in four stages from 2021, the port will consolidate all existing port operations at Tanjong Pagar, Pasir Panjang, Keppel, and Pulau Brani, and centralise it in the Tuas Terminal from 2027. When fully operational, the port can potentially handle a capacity of about 65 million TEUs a year, double of the current capacity. New technologies will be employed to increase productivity.

Approximately twice the size of Ang Mo Kio town, when fully operational in 2040, the Tuas Mega Port will be the world's largest fully automated terminal, with features such as automated wharf and yard functions, and fully-electric automated guided vehicles to carry out its key operations. The project broke ground on 3 October 2019.

To optimise land use, an area for leisure purposes is currently under study. The plan is to construct a 150-hectare (370-acre) area that will be elevated 42 metres above ground to house recreational amenities such as cafes, retail stores, and a jogging track. Large retail outlets such as Tesco and Decathlon are being considered to bring in weekend crowds. The area will be partly opened for public use and its accessibility will be greatly improved if plans for the Tuas South MRT Extension on the East–West Line come into fruition.

=== Woodlands Gateway ===
Plans for a bus interchange connected to Woodlands North MRT/RTS station were first announced in the Urban Redevelopment Authority's Draft Master Plan 2013, later reiterated in the Draft Master Plan 2025.

In July 2026, JTC Corporation unveiled plans for the Woodlands Gateway. Occupying a total of 35 ha (86 acres) once fully completed, the first phase of the development will comprise a 5.66 ha (14.0 acres) mixed-use transport hub, of which 6,500 m^{2} (1.6 acres) will be occupied by a bus interchange. The transport hub is planned to open around 2030.

== Healthcare ==
=== SGH Campus Master Plan ===
Unveiled on 5 February 2016, the 43-hectare Singapore General Hospital (SGH) Campus at Outram will be redeveloped and expanded over the next two decades. Patient care facilities will take up 60% of the land, with the remaining 40% dedicated to research and education purposes anchored by the Duke-NUS Medical School and a new Research Park. The master plan will be carried out in two phases. Phase 1 includes new developments such as the already-completed Outram Community Hospital, SGH Accident & Emergency Block, SGH Elective Care Centre, a new National Dental Centre Singapore (NDCS), and a new National Cancer Centre Singapore (NCCS). After the completion of Phase 1, Phase 2 will begin with the development of an entirely new SGH complex.

The road network within the campus will also be improved and extended with increased road capacity to provide better connectivity between the developments. Pedestrian and vehicular traffic will be separated to allow faster access for ambulances and patients while easing congestion on the campus. To improve accessibility and convenience for patients and visitors, facilities with high patient volume such as the new NDCS and NCCS and the new SGH complex will be relocated closer to Outram Park MRT station.

=== Health City Novena ===
Unveiled on 30 August 2013, the 17-hectare (42-acre) Health City Novena is an upcoming integrated healthcare complex that will physically link up 10 buildings including, the Tan Tock Seng Hospital (TTSH), a medical school, and public and volunteer healthcare facilities in the area. The master plan includes an Ambulatory Centre at TTSH, the already-completed National Centre for Infectious Disease (NCID), an expanded National Skin Centre and National Healthcare Group headquarters, and a new Integrated Intermediate Care Hub (IICH) comprising Dover Park Hospice and a community hospital that will be connected to TTSH and Ren Ci Hospital for seamless patient transfers.

The complex is planned to support a full range of holistic care experiences as well as health services, research and education, commercial, leisure, and public spaces.

The entire development is expected to be completed by 2030.

=== EGH Campus ===
Announced on 5 March 2020, there will be a new 1,400-bed integrated hospital campus in the east of Singapore to ease the load on the existing Changi General Hospital (CGH) - currently the only hospital in the east. The tech-enabled hospital, located next to Bedok North MRT station, will be Singapore's 12th public general hospital and is to be managed by SingHealth. The general hospital, Eastern General Hospital, will provide emergency services alongside inpatient and specialist outpatient services, while the community hospital, Eastern Community Hospital, will provide intermediate services such as rehabilitation to support patients who are discharged from the general hospital.

The pandemic-ready hospital will begin operating virtual wards in 2026 via teleconsultations and monitoring patients at home remotely before it is fully operational by 2030.

=== NUH Campus Master Plan ===
Announced on 15 May 2024, the existing National University Hospital campus will be redeveloped from 2025. Similar to the SGH Campus master plan, the entire redevelopment plan will span over a decade, with added hospital capacity, better land use, and improvement works to the existing road network.

=== Tengah Integrated General and Community Hospital ===
Set to be completed by the early 2030s, the upcoming integrated general and community hospital in Tengah is built to serve the new Tengah town and the growing population in other parts of the western region of Singapore. The new hospital will be operated by the National University Health System (NUHS).

=== Redevelopment of Alexandra Hospital ===
Announced on 5 March 2020, Alexandra Hospital will be redeveloped and expanded from 12.2 hectares (30 acres) to 13.1 hectares (32 acres). The total number of beds will be increased from 300 beds to 1,300 beds as part of the expansion. The redevelopment will allow for greater accessibility from Queensway, and house more spaces for trials on new care models. It will also place focus on preserving the hospital's history and heritage, where conserved Blocks 1, 2, and 6 will be retained. Instead of the current urgent care centre, a new pandemic-ready emergency department directly connected to intensive care units and operating theatres will be built to better serve emergency medical cases. In addition to the expansion of the main hospital, a 400-bed nursing home will also be built in a separate building located within the campus.

The redevelopment is estimated to be completed in phases from 2028 with the addition of two high-rise towers.

=== Refurbishment of Mount Elizabeth Hospital ===
Named "Project Renaissance", the refurbishment of Mount Elizabeth Hospital at Orchard will cost approximately S$350 million and take three years to complete. The project will see a new drop-off area and hospital lobby, upgrades to the hospital's equipment and existing technology, and an expansion to the emergency department and treatment centres.

The refurbishment works will be carried out in phases with certain services being temporarily relocated to minimise disruptions.

=== Proposed dementia care village ===
Announced on 16 July 2019, Singapore will be building its first dementia care village to care for people with dementia and improve their quality of life and residential options available to them. The special village will be built on a site in Gibraltar Crescent near Sembawang Park. The site houses 10 cluster bungalows, which are to be remained, across two land plots. Other than providing a safe, home-like environment, the village will also offer customised services and programmes to foster meaningful and active interaction among its residents.

On 19 May 2020, the Urban Redevelopment Authority (URA) has rejected the sole tender of the site as the bid of S$15 million was deemed to be too low.

Even though there are no bids for the Sembawang site, Perennial won a tender for a private assisted living development at Parry Avenue in Kovan that can house approximately 400 seniors.

== Education ==
=== Ngee Ann Kongsi Building (Expansion of LASALLE College of the Arts) ===
A new S$50 million, 20,000 square-metre 12-storey block, directly connected to Rochor MRT station, will be built on a 6,000-square-metre (65,000 sq ft) site adjacent to the existing LASALLE College of the Arts McNally Street campus to centralise the school's facilities. With the expansion, students will not need to travel to different campuses for classes. The expansion will include new facilities such as a 300-seat lecture theatre, a music recital hall, a film studio, and new public galleries. The new building, to be built with the S$50 million donation from Ngee Ann Kongsi, will also feature a glass facade that opens out to Rochor Canal Road.

Originally planned to be completed by 2025, no construction work had begun by then due to delays caused by the COVID-19 pandemic.

=== Goh Keng Swee Centre for Education ===
An expansion of the existing Ministry of Education (MOE) headquarters in Buona Vista, the new 30-storey building will consolidate approximately 2,000 staff from the various MOE headquarters around the island as well as the School Cluster Centre, the Singapore Centre for Chinese Language, and the Academy of Singapore Teachers. Academies such as the English Language Institute of Singapore and the Singapore Teachers' Academy for the Arts will also be relocated to the new tower. The existing MOE Heritage Centre in Balestier will also be moved to the new building when completed.

Construction is set to begin in 2025 and completed in 2029.

== Attractions ==
=== Founders' Memorial ===
With construction works officially beginning on 5 June 2024, the 5-hectare (12-acre) Founders' Memorial at Bay East Garden, is scheduled to be completed in 2028 to honour the pioneer leaders of Singapore. The building will feature clean architecture lines and a flowing linear green terrain, with lush greenery and foliage, that leads visitors to an amphitheatre that is suitable for large-scale gatherings. The waterfront site will offer visitors a clear view of the Singapore skyline. Other than the amphitheatre, the building will also feature a viewing gallery, permanent and temporary galleries, a visitor centre, multi-purpose rooms, a lake, and a forest trail.

The Founders' Memorial will be served by the future Founders' Memorial MRT station on the Thomson–East Coast Line, which will be opened in tandem with the development.

=== Gardens by the Bay expansion ===
Upgrades and expansion works are currently underway at Gardens by the Bay to increase its overall capacity and stay relevant in the tourism sector while being financially sustainable.

==== Bay East Garden ====
Located across the existing Bay South Garden, the upcoming Bay East Garden is set to expand the current Gardens by the Bay by close to 31 hectares (77 acres). The new garden will house the Founders' Memorial, which is currently under construction. It will be split into two themed zones, one inspired by the past and the other by the future. The past zone will feature native and naturalised plant species, and heritage trees such as the tembusu tree that was commonly planted in the past. On the other hand, the future zone will feature a wetland where greenery is integrated with the urban landscape.

A bridge connecting Bay South Garden and Bay East Garden is currently being studied. A tender for its design will be called by the end of 2022.

Bay East Garden is expected to be completed in 2027, alongside the new Founders' Memorial.

==== Experiential attraction at Kingfisher Wetlands ====
Currently in the planning phase, a new experiential attraction at Gardens by the Bay will incorporate elements of augmented and virtual reality to provide visitors with a different experience in the 1.5-hectare Kingfisher Wetlands. Construction will take approximately three years.

==== Revamp of Cloud Forest Dome ====
A revamp of the exhibition space and the Cloud Forest Gallery in the Cloud Forest dome will begin in May 2024, where both of the spaces will provide an immersive and educational experience for visitors. At the same time, the Orchid Haven will also undergo refurbishment as part of upgrading works to the overall gardens.

==== Upgrades to Bay South Family Zone ====
A woodland-themed playground is currently under construction and will open in 2025. In addition, the existing community garden within the Active Garden will be revamped with a shelter by end-2024 for better accessibility, along with barrier-free walkways and elevated planting beds.

A food and beverage outlet serving a horticulture-themed menu will also be introduced in the garden, replacing the existing Mylo cafe.

==== Future plans ====
The design team for Gardens by the Bay has revealed that there are plans for a new domed conservatory. This will be the third dome after the existing Flower Dome and Cloud Forest domes.

The existing outdoor event space, The Meadow, would also be further developed to cater for mid-sized concerts. An underground carpark to increase the garden's parking capacity and a new attraction featuring a nocturnal garden may also be added to the existing area.

=== Greater Sentosa ===
First proposed in 2018 as the Sentosa-Brani Master Plan, the islands of Sentosa and Pulau Brani will be redeveloped within the next two to three decades. The islands will be divided into five zones: "Vibrant Cluster" will feature large-scale attractions spanning both islands, "Island Heart" will feature hotels, commercial and conference spaces, "Waterfront" will have a Discovery Park situated on Pulau Brani, "Ridgeline" will connect green spaces from Mount Faber to Mount Imbiah, featuring nature and heritage attractions, and "Beachfront" will have a water show, fairgrounds and other attractions to rejuvenate Sentosa's beaches. A "Downtown South" resort, similar to the current NTUC Downtown East in Pasir Ris, was also planned.

The first project to be built under the plan is the S$90 million Sentosa Sensoryscape, which opened on 14 March 2024. It is a themed two-tiered thoroughfare connecting Resorts World Sentosa and the southern beaches, featuring lookout points, water attractions and other architectural elements, thereby creating a multi-sensory experience. Sentosa Sensoryscape replaced the area occupied by the Sentosa Merlion, which closed its operations on 20 October 2019.

On 2 March 2026, Minister of Trade and Industry Alvin Tan announced the first phase of the Greater Sentosa Master Plan. The plan includes a new attraction atop Mount Imbiah on Sentosa known as Imbiah Canopy, a new transport hub to link the islands, and replacing the Sentosa Express.

=== Integrated Resorts expansion ===
Announced on 3 April 2019, the Marina Bay Sands (MBS) and Resorts World Sentosa (RWS) will be expanded, with the plans costing S$9 billion.

==== Marina Bay Sands (MBS) ====
The MBS will build a new 15,000-seat indoor entertainment arena, as well as a fourth tower containing 587 hotel all-suite rooms, a sky roof with a swimming pool and a "signature restaurant". New ballrooms, exhibition halls will be built with food and beverage options to expand. The tower will be located next to the existing development. The expansion project is set to be completed by 2030.

==== Resorts World Sentosa (RWS) ====
The RWS will have two new attractions, Minion Land and Super Nintendo World, at Universal Studios Singapore. The existing S.E.A. Aquarium will expand thrice its current size and be rebranded as the Singapore Oceanarium.

In addition, RWS will also add two new hotels with a total capacity of 1,100 rooms and a future lifestyle complex at the waterfront. The waterfront promenade will be revamped to include new night shows and an event zone, with a new Adventure Dining Playhouse to replace the existing Resorts World Theatre. A driverless system will also be built across the Sentosa Boardwalk for better connectivity.

RWS's new attractions will open in phases, yearly from 2020, and expected to be fully completed by 2025. However, due to the COVID-19 pandemic, the expansion has been announced that it will be delayed due to disruptions in the global supply chain. A re-design to the expansion will also be carried out to ensure adaptability to the post COVID-19 environment.

On 26 May 2022, work for the new Minion Land at Universal Studios Singapore began with a groundbreaking ceremony. The expansion is expected to be operationally-ready in 2024. It will house multiple rides including the motion-simulator 3D ride - Despicable Me Minion Mayhem.

==== Additional gaming provisions and casino levies/taxes increase ====
MBS and RWS, should they decide to expand gaming facilities, will be allowed space of 2,000 square metres and 500 square metres respectively adding to the current 15,000 sq m each, with 1,000 and 800 new machines respectively on top of the 2,500 each. This will still lead to a drop in approved gaming areas from 3.1 per cent to 2.3 per cent given the increase in non-gaming areas.

As a result of these changes, the exclusivity period of the IRs will be extended to end-2030, with casino levies for Singaporeans and PRs increasing to S$150 daily and S$3,000 annually, taking effect on 4 April 2019. From August 2019, a second daily or annual casino entry levy can only be purchased if the current levy expires within six hours, taking effect after six hours of purchase.

From March 2022, casino tax rates will also increase from the current 5 per cent and 15 per cent for premium and mass gaming, respectively, to a two-tier tax rates of 8 per cent and 12 per cent (premium) and 18 per cent and 22 per cent (mass) based on the total gross gaming revenue earned. A flat tax rate of 22 per cent (mass) and 12 per cent (premium) will be imposed should the IRs' investment commitments fail. The tax rates will remain unchanged for a decade.

=== NS Square ===
First announced in 2017 and a reveal of the artist's impressions and further details on 9 August 2020, the NS Square is set to replace the existing Marina Bay floating platform (The Float @ Marina Bay) and is envisioned to be the central focus of the new downtown area. The development will be aligned on a central axis, with The Promontory on the opposite side of the bay, offering a panoramic view of the city skyline.

Like its predecessor, the NS Square will continue to host future National Day Parades, as well as a new addition of a permanent gallery dedicated to national servicemen (NSmen) and honour their past and present contributions. The NS Square will be a permanent space for large-scale national events and has a seating capacity of 30,000. It will also include community sports facilities, such as a swimming pool and water sports centre, as well as a waterfront promenade with F&B and retail outlets that will improve pedestrian connectivity.

Since the Singapore Grand Prix was extended beyond 2021, the temporary closure of the floating platform for construction works of the NS Square has caused a realignment to the Marina Bay Street Circuit. In particular, the 300-metre stretch from Turns 16 to 19 along the floating platform. This was the first major adjustment to the circuit since 2008.

The project is expected to be completed by 2027.

=== Phoenix Park ===
The historic Phoenix Park at Tanglin will be developed into a lifestyle destination that will include wellness attractions and retail spaces. Work is set to begin in October 2026, and to be completed by the first quarter of 2027.

=== Porsche Experience Centre Singapore ===
Set to be Porsche's first experience centre in Southeast Asia and the eleventh centre worldwide, the Porsche Experience Centre Singapore will be located adjacent to Changi Exhibition Centre. It will feature a 2 km handling track and an aftersales facility alongside other family-friendly experiences including themed exhibitions and racing simulators. It is expected to be completed by 2027 and will be Singapore's first permanent facility focused on driving.

=== Science Centre Singapore ===
Designed by Zaha Hadid Architects, the new Science Centre Singapore will be larger than the current centre to house more gallery spaces for thematic exhibitions and enhanced educational facilities such as specialised laboratories for visitors to conduct hands-on experiments and create new inventions. It will also have more outdoor programmes for visitors to explore the interaction between nature and science. The centre will also have a maker space for organisations to test their prototypes or for creators to use a 3D-printer. A new observatory, outdoor activity plaza, and children's gallery will also be part of the new centre.

The new centre, set to be completed by 2027, will be located at a waterfront site next to Chinese Garden MRT station. The existing centre will continue to operate until the new centre opens, before being repurposed for other uses.

=== Therme Singapore ===
Set to open in Marina South in 2030, the upcoming 4-hectare wellness attraction will offer a plethora of wellness experiences such as therapeutic arts, and light- and frequency-based therapies. Health facilities and indoor-outdoor fitness experiences are also being proposed as part of the attraction. However, there will be no accommodations being developed as part of the site.

=== Proposed new attraction in Jurong Lake District ===
On 16 April 2019, the Singapore Tourism Board announced a new 7-hectare integrated tourism development in Jurong Lake District, which will be built by 2026. The development will feature a hotel, attractions, eateries and shops and will be located near to the new Science Centre Singapore and the Chinese Garden MRT station. A request for proposal was launched by STB on 15 March 2022, with the development now expected by 2028. The companies successful in the tender will get a 6-decade lease for the site, which will require an emphasis on technology, edutainment and sustainability concepts.

=== Proposed Southern Islands marine park ===
Currently under planning, the southern portion of Lazarus Island and the reef area off Kusu Island will house Singapore's second marine park due to its rich marine life. Planned to provide visitors an opportunity to learn more about marine biodiversity and enjoy recreational activities such as walking trails, finalisation of the park's boundaries is expected to be completed by 2025.

The announcement came a decade after the designation of the first marine park, located at the nearby Sisters' Islands.

=== Proposed suspended LED sky screen ===
Announced on 29 June 2022 by The Place Holdings, Singapore is set to be home to Southeast Asia's largest suspended LED interactive sky screen when completed. Designed after the Shimao Tianjie Sky Screen in Beijing, the 200-metre screen is expected to be constructed within one and a half years at an undisclosed location and is capable of broadcasting live events such as concerts.

== Community/Leisure ==
=== Parks ===
==== Bukit Batok Nature Corridor ====
Consisting of over 125 hectares of nature parks and 10 km of nature trails, the Bukit Batok Nature Corridor will link the existing Bukit Timah Nature Reserve to the upcoming Tengah Forest Corridor. Existing trails will be upgraded and enhanced, along with new nodes such as an exercise plaza, play area, and a rejuvenated stream. A new boardwalk and viewing deck over the existing quarry at Bukit Batok Nature Park are also part of the plan. Aside from Bukit Batok Nature Park, such enhancements will also be made at the existing Bukit Batok Town Park and the upcoming Bukit Batok Hillside Nature Park. Construction works are expected to begin in 2026 and be completed in phases from 2028.

==== Bukit Timah–Rochor Green Corridor ====
An 11 km elevated green link running above and parallel to the Bukit Timah Canal, the Bukit Timah–Rochor Green Corridor will provide visitors an easy connection between Jurong Lake Gardens, Singapore Botanic Gardens, and Gardens by the Bay. New trees will be planted on both sides of the link to create a "riverine rainforest experience" while providing shade.

The first phase, consisting of a 1.4 km elevated park above the canal, is scheduled to be completed by 2027.

==== Clementi Nature Corridor ====
Announced in July 2021, the Clementi Nature Corridor will consist of the 2 km long Clementi Nature Trail that will connect the Rail Corridor at Clementi Forest with an upcoming park at Dover Forest, the 4 km long Old Jurong Line Nature Trail that will run along the route of the former Jurong railway line, and the 2 km long Jurong Town Hall Park Connector (PC) that will connect the network to Jurong Lake Gardens, along with the existing Ulu Pandan PC running along Sungei Ulu Pandan. A 500 m stretch of the Clementi Nature Trail and a section of the Jurong Town Hall PC were completed in 2023 and September 2024, respectively.

==== Khatib Nature Corridor ====
Announced by the National Parks Board (NParks) on 6 June 2022, the upcoming Khatib Nature Corridor will connect the Central Catchment Nature Reserve with the future 40-hectare Khatib Bongsu Nature Park in Khatib. Aside from the existing Springleaf Nature Park and forested sites at Tagore and Lower Selatar Reservoir, the corridor will also include three new parks: Nee Soon Nature Park in Springleaf, Miltonia Nature Park in Miltonia Close, and a park on the Orchid Country Club site, whose lease will expire in 2030. The corridor will be linked up with the Round Island Route, Coast-to-Coast Northern Trail, and the Central Corridor.

==== Raffles Place Park revamp ====
Situated in the heart of the Raffles Place district and above Raffles Place MRT station, the existing 0.6-hectare Raffles Place Park will be revamped by 2028. Plans for the park include improved accessibility and expanded greenery for its users to gather and relax through gatherings, events, and activities held at the revamped park.

==== Sungei Buloh Nature Park Network ====
Announced on 19 August 2020, the upcoming Sungei Buloh Nature Park Network will become Singapore's second nature park network when completed. The nature park covers an area of more than 400 hectares (990 acres) and consists of the existing Sungei Buloh Wetland Reserve and Kranji Marshes, the upcoming Mandai Mangrove and Mudflat and Lim Chu Kang Nature Park, and other smaller nature areas.

The 72.8-hectare (180-acre) Mandai Mangrove and Mudflat, formerly out of bounds to the public, will be refurbished with basic amenities such as a nature trail, bicycle racks, and bird hides for public access. Once completed, the nature park will be Singapore's third largest nature park after Chestnut and Dairy Farm Nature Parks. Featuring coastal trails and bird hides for bird observation, the Mandai Mangrove and Mudflat is expected to be opened in phases from 2028.

The 18-hectare (44-acre) Lim Chu Kang Nature Park, formerly the Western Extension, will be linked up with the Lim Chu Kang mangroves and feature outdoor play areas. The century-old Cashin House at the edge of the shore will also be reconstructed for educational purposes with new facilities such as an exhibition space, seminar rooms, and a seaview terrace. The adjoining pier will also be refurbished.

The entire network, boasting more than 15 km of nature trails, will be connected to the Round-Island-Route.

=== Bukit Timah Integrated Development ===
Located on the site of the existing Bukit Timah Market and Food Centre, the upcoming integrated development in Bukit Timah will house the relocated Bukit Timah Community Club, a market and hawker centre, indoor sports hall, community library, and facilities for the elderly. An interim facility will be built to house the relocated market and hawker centre while construction works are taking place from 2024.

Located near Beauty World MRT station, the integrated development is expected to be completed by 2029.

=== Joo Chiat Community Hub ===
Set to replace the existing Siglap South Community Centre, the new Joo Chiat Community Hub will be more than three times the size of the existing centre. The new hub will house facilities such as a running track, jamming studio, community plaza, multi-purpose hall, black box theatre, and a rooftop gym. A new road will also be built to improve connectivity to the community hub.

The new hub is expected to be completed in 2029.

=== Kallang Alive Master Plan ===
Announced by Sport Singapore (SportSG) on 6 August 2019, the area around Kallang and the Singapore Sports Hub is set to be further enhanced as a destination for sport and world-class entertainment and inject vibrancy into the area while complementing the already-completed Singapore Sports Hub. There will be a total of six developments with the entire project set to be completed by 2025.

Included in the plan is Singapore's first velodrome to cater to the community and serve as the national training centre for track cycling. The velodrome will be part of the Youth Hub which include spaces for non-traditional sports such as speed climbing and parkour.

Built on the former Kallang baseball/softball field, the Kallang Football Hub will house the national training centre and ActiveSG Football Academy. The facility consists of a full-sized natural turf pitch, two full-sized artificial pitches, and a half-sized pitch. Four sheltered futsal pitches and a perimeter running track will also be part of the facility.

Replacing one of the outdoor carparks near the Kallang Leisure Park, the new tennis facility, Singapore Tennis Centre, will consist of open and sheltered courts and similarly function as the national training centre and ActiveSG Academy. The new facility will replace the current centre and will be opened to the public.

The Kallang Theatre and its surrounding areas will be redeveloped into an integrated sport, entertainment, and lifestyle centre. Some proposed ideas include office spaces, a multi-purpose e-sports arena, a themed hotel, and an international sports medicine centre.

A circular walking and cycling loop named Alive Gateway and Loop will also be built to trace the original Kallang Airport airfield and link to the waterfront. This would reintegrate the old Kallang Airport site with the overall precinct.

Benaan Kapal Green, an active community park space, will be introduced along the waterfront and includes park connectors, running trails, and play areas for the public.

However, with the development of the master plan, current spaces for sports such as archery, cricket, softball, baseball, netball, and squash will have to be vacated to make way for the development, with most already left the premises.

=== Mandai Avenue Columbarium ===
Currently under study by the National Environment Agency (NEA), a 10-hectare site located next to Nee Soon Camp will be developed into a new funeral services and columbarium complex to support the expected increased demand for after-death facilities in the future as the existing Mandai and Yishun columbariums are nearing full capacity.

=== Marine Parade Community Building upgrades ===
Closed in June 2022, the existing Marine Parade Community Building will be demolished and redeveloped into a new community building. Despite calls for conservation, the building's iconic mural art wall facade is set to be removed as part of the upgrading works. Measuring 63 metres in width and 12 metres in height, the mosaic facade is Singapore's largest installation art piece.

=== Olympic-size ice rink at Pandan Gardens ===
To be built on the site of the former Pandan Gardens Swimming Complex, the upcoming sports facility will house an Olympic-sized ice rink and a smaller version approximately a third of the Olympic size. Construction is set to begin in March 2025 and completed by the end of 2026.

=== PAssion Wave Bayfront Outpost ===
Located at the Marina Bay Waterfront Promenade near the Red Dot Design Museum, the new PAssion Wave outpost will allow users to enjoy a range of water recreational activities such as kayaking, pedal boating, and dragon boating while enjoying views of Marina Bay. The seventh such facility in Singapore, the Bayfront outpost was expected to open in 2025. By May 2026, the new outpost was still in the works.

=== Punggol Bike Village ===
Expected to be completed by the end of 2024, the upcoming Punggol Bike Village will be located underneath existing track viaducts at Punggol MRT station. To be developed by SBS Transit, the area will feature amenities such as retail shops for cycling equipments and food and beverages trucks.

=== Singapore Indoor Stadium replacement ===
Announced on 7 March 2024, the existing Singapore Indoor Stadium will be replaced with a new state-of-the-art indoor arena built adjacent the existing stadium. The current Singapore Indoor Stadium will continue to operate until the new arena is completed.

=== Tanjong Pagar Railway Station restoration ===
Vacant for over a decade, the former Tanjong Pagar railway station will begin restoration works as a national monument in 2024. Part of the upcoming Greater Southern Waterfront development and the southern entry point to the Rail Corridor, the railway station will be integrated with the upcoming Cantonment MRT station. Estimated to cost approximately S$40 million, works are expected to be completed by 2026.

=== Toa Payoh Integrated Development ===
Unveiled on 26 February 2023, a new regional sports centre, a redeveloped Toa Payoh polyclinic, an expanded public library, and an upgraded Toa Payoh town park will be built on a 12-hectare site near the Toa Payoh town centre. Plans also include relocating the existing national training centres for aquatics, netball, and table tennis to the new development. The regional sports centre will house swimming pools, a football stadium, indoor sports halls, and sheltered sports courts. The integrated development will feature a 10,000-seater stadium, a 2,000-seater aquatic centre with four indoor swimming pools and three outdoor leisure pools, and a main 5,000-seater indoor hall with more than twenty badminton courts.

The integrated development is expected to be completed by 2030.

=== Redevelopment of Clementi Stadium ===
Located in Clementi, the existing Clementi Stadium and its adjacent vacant site will be redeveloped into a new stadium with softball and baseball fields, and other sports facilities. With the new fields, the stadium will support training for the national softball and baseball teams. The redeveloped stadium is expected to open by 2030.

=== Redevelopment of Road Safety Community Park ===
Located at East Coast Park, the over 4-decade-old Road Safety Community Park will be redeveloped and modernised to adapt to the changing traffic and road environments. Further details will be released once studies are completed.

=== Redevelopment of ROM and ROMM Building ===
To be temporarily relocated to Esplanade Mall while redevelopment works are ongoing, the existing site at Canning Rise housing the Registry of Marriages (ROM) and Registry of Muslim Marriages (ROMM) will be redeveloped and expanded with more modern venues for solemnisation such as rooftop and green spaces within and outside the building. The iconic pitched roof will also be recreated as part of the redevelopment works. Construction is set to be completed in 2028.

== Military/Security ==
=== Tengah Airbase ===
Paya Lebar Airbase is bound to be retired and freed up for commercial or residential use by 2030. As such, the aircraft will be moved to the newly expanded Tengah Airbase, which has already begun construction. The land surrounding the area has been recently acquired by the government, including cemeteries, graves and agricultural farms in the nearby area. More training areas and a second runway will be built.

=== Home Team Operations Centre ===
A new operations centre will be built to house officers from the various law enforcement agencies such as the Singapore Police Force, Singapore Civil Defence Force, Immigration and Checkpoints Authority, and Central Narcotics Bureau under one roof. The new building will help officers to respond to reported incidents in a quicker and more comprehensively manner.

The centre is expected to be completed by 2032.

=== Expansion of Woodlands Checkpoint ===
First announced on 30 March 2017 by the Immigration and Checkpoints Authority (ICA), the current Woodlands Checkpoint will be expanded with the addition of a new wing to be built at the site of the Old Woodlands Town Centre, adjacent to the checkpoint. The approximately 8-hectare site will help to boost clearance capacity and meet growing cross-border traffic needs.

While demolition works are being carried out at the site, the ICA is currently conducting a feasibility study to determine the optimal design of the expansion and the extent of the upgrading and redevelopment works. However, the ICA did not state if the new wing will be meant for vehicular or human traffic, nor state the completion date of the expansion.

On 26 May 2022, the ICA announced that the expansion will include areas aside from the Old Woodands Town Centre. This updated plan will involve the acquisition of nine Housing and Development Board (HDB) blocks located adjacent to the existing checkpoint by the second quarter of 2028. Apart from the added capacity, the expansion will also see "flexi-lanes" that are equipped to clear cars and motorcycles, thereby reducing clearance time. To support the expanded checkpoint, surrounding roads and the existing Bukit Timah Expressway will be extended and upgraded to funnel traffic directly to and from the new extension. This first phase of the expansion consists of 21 new bidirectional cargo lanes and 78 new arrival car lanes at the Old Woodlands Town Centre extension, and is expected to be completed and operational from 2028. After which, the old Woodlands Checkpoint will be demolished and redeveloped to integrate with the new extension by 2032.

On 17 March 2024, the ICA and JTC Corporation announced that 44 hectares of land will be reclaimed off the Johor Straits. Reclamation will take place on each side of the Causeway with 34 hectares on the western side and 10 hectares on the eastern side. The western portion will be carried out in two phases and take five years to complete while the eastern portion will be completed within three and a half years. Works will begin in the third quarter of 2024 and end by 2029.

Overall, the Woodlands Checkpoint will be expanded to five times its current size, totalling 95 hectares. Construction will be carried out in several phases starting from 2025, and will be completed in the next ten to fifteen years.

== See also ==
- Administrative divisions of Singapore
  - Subdivisions of Singapore
  - Constituencies of Singapore
- Urban planning in Singapore
  - Regions of Singapore
  - Urban planning areas in Singapore
  - Marina Bay
  - Downtown Core
- Urban renewal in Singapore
  - Land reclamation in Singapore
  - List of tallest buildings in Singapore
- Geography of Singapore
