= Weld Road =

Road in Singapore

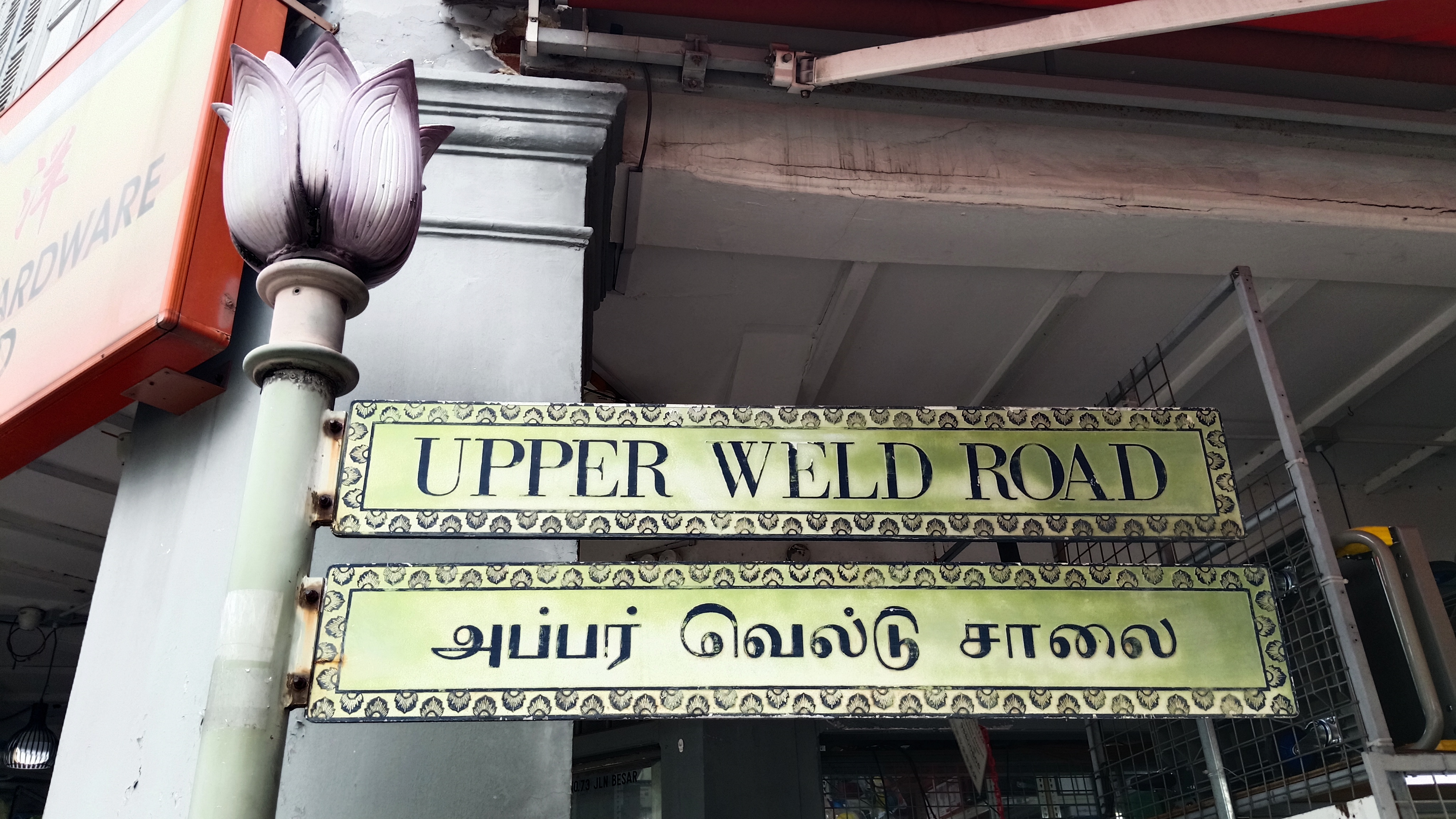
- A street sign indicating Upper Weld Road, with a decorative lotus flower motif.
- Owner: Land Transport Authority (LTA); Urban Redevelopment Authority (URA)
- Maintained by: LTA
- Nearest Mass Rapid Transit System station: Jalan Besar MRT station

Other
- Known for: Named after Frederick Weld

Weld Road (Tamil: வெல்டு சாலை) is the name of a road in Rochor that connects Jalan Besar to Little India, Singapore. The road is named after Frederick Weld, a British colonial administrator who served as the Governor of the Straits Settlements from 1880 to 1887. Divided in two parts, the road starts at Kampong Kapor road in Little India and stops at Jalan Besar, before continuing all the way into Arab Street; with the first half being named Upper Weld Road and the second being Secondary Weld Road.

Historic shophouses can be seen in the Little India segment of the road, some of which had been put up for sale in 2021. The first Build-To-Order (BTO) housing projects in Rochor, known as River Peaks I & II, are located along this road. The Jalan Besar MRT station on the Downtown Line is situated at the junction of this road and the station's namesake, Jalan Besar.

== See also ==
- Rochor
- Little India
