= SCCL =

SCCL, sccl or other capitalisations, may refer to:

- Societat Cooperativa Catalana Limitada, SCCL, s.c.c.l. (also s.coop.c.l), a type of business entity (Catalonia, Spain)
- Singareni Collieries Company, SCCL, Indian coal mining company
- Singapore Centre for Chinese Language, a Chinese language school in Singapore
- Single Comb Clean Legged (SCCL), description within the American Standard of Perfection poultry standard
- Swiss Cancer Centre Lausanne, in Switzerland
- IATO code for Caldera Airport, Chile (List of airports in Chile)
- Supply Chain Coordination Ltd., the organisation which operates NHS Supply Chain in England
