= Urban renewal in Singapore =

Land redevelopment programmes in Singapore

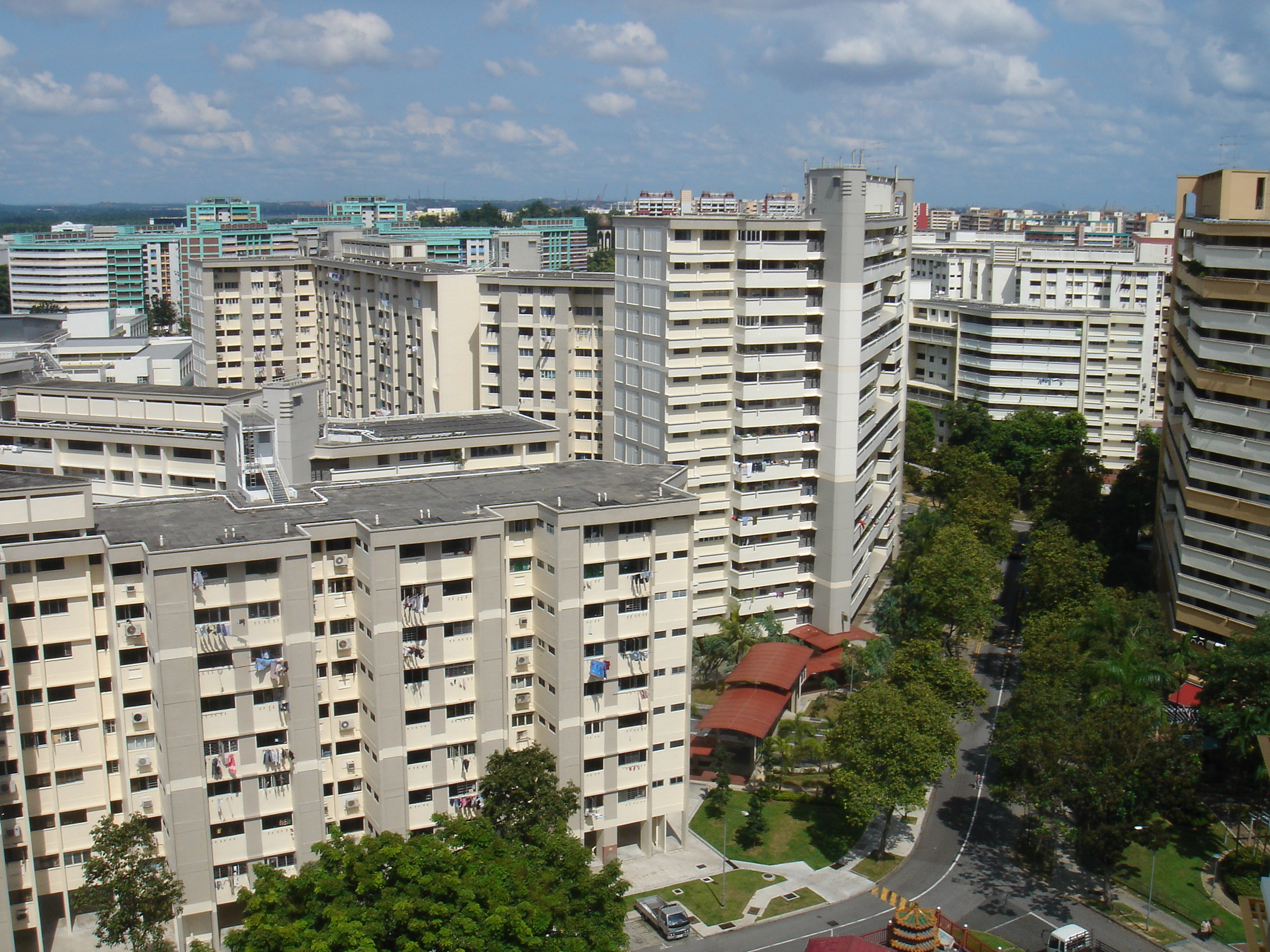
Housing and Development Board apartment blocks in Yishun

Urban renewal in Singapore refers to land redevelopment programmes in areas of moderate to high density urban land use in the Republic of Singapore.

== Background ==
The history of Singapore's urban renewal goes back to the time period surrounding the Second World War, when it was still a British dependency. Even before the war, Singapore's housing environment was already a problem. The tension of both infrastructure and housing conditions was worsened by the rapidly-increasing Singapore population in the 1930s. As a consequence of the war and the lack of economic development, the previous evils of housing conditions continued between the 1940s to the 1950s. Up to 240,000 squatters were in the Singapore during the 1950s because of the movement of migrants, especially from Peninsular Malaysia and the baby boom.

In mid-1959, overcrowded slums were inhabited by a big number of squatter populations, and the areas lacked the existence of service facilities such as sanitation.

== 1960s ==
Since the Singapore government had been in charge, urban renewal included in the part of the national improvement policy that was urgently put in action. Before that, the 1958 master plan had already been designed to solve the city problems. However, due to the lack of urban planning experts caused by the deficiency of professional staff, criticism came from many urban practitioners. The professional team recommended by the United Nations then was asked by the government to cope with the urban renewal matters and its redevelopment plan in 1961. Based on the UN assistance report, two pilot developments were initiated in the end of 1964 by the government. These redevelopments then led to the success of Singapore's urban renewal because the government could provide sufficient amount of public housing and business areas.

=== Reactions ===
In the establishment of urban renewal programmes, some difficulties were experienced by the PAP government. The obstacles came from the resistance of people who used to live in the slums and squatters. It was reported by Singapore newspapers that those people were reluctant to be replaced. This became the major problems of 1960s redevelopment schemes. Affordable land value also became one of its reasons. Another problem was that the government had to purchase the private land owned by the middle and upper society to make the land vacant and be used for redevelopment.

== The State and City Planning Project ==
=== The Central Area ===
Business and residential districts were planned for the Central Area by the UN Main Project (SCP) and Subproject. The combination of development public accommodation and infrastructure and private development was visualised in the Central Area redevelopment plan. During 1970 to 1995, four major actions were implemented in the Central Area: public housing and service facilities such as stores and marketplaces; the same standards of URA sales programmes with the private developers in constructing the relocation centres and commercial building; the preservation of shopping areas such as Chinatown, Little India and Bussorah Street areas in URA 1988 master plan for conservation; and letting the private sector own the land, especially along Orchard Road.

=== Orchard Road ===
There were few changes made to Orchard Road where it was a residential area and then slightly altered by the business area development. In 1949, the McDonald House office was built. In the 1950s, Orchard Road was turned into a central car distribution centre. In addition, the construction of high-rise apartments began in the early 1960s. Ngee Ann City, Emerald Hill, and Cairnhill Mansion were such cases even if these buildings did not succeed in attracting people's attention. Various other alterations followed, such as the emergence of hotel expansion in mid 1960s, and Orchard Road grew to be the most important shopping districts in Singapore by the mid 1980s. However, in the early 1980s, the government occupied the remaining areas to create an efficient city by recovering a wide range of infrastructures such as road improvement, sewer drainage and telecommunications.

=== Precinct NI ===
This estate has 32 ha of area covered and 2.4 km from the business district centres of Raffles Place and Singapore River. In 1964, redeveloping started, finishing in 1982, except the sites in the Beach Road and the MRT station in Crawford (Lavender MRT station) reserved for upcoming development. The government demolished the old buildings in the Precincts NI and left only Masjid Hajjah Fatimah as a national monument of historical conservation. It constructed the new Precincts NI, based on the plan. Today, it is known as Kampong Glam.

== See also ==
- Administrative divisions of Singapore
  - Subdivisions of Singapore
  - Constituencies of Singapore
- Urban planning in Singapore
  - Regions of Singapore
  - Urban planning areas in Singapore
- Future developments in Singapore
  - Land reclamation in Singapore
- Geography of Singapore
