= Long Island (Singapore) =

Proposed land reclamation project in Singapore

Coordinates: 1.3°N 103.94°E

Long Island is a proposed land reclamation work in Singapore, situated off the coast of the seaside he Urban Redevelopment Authority, the project aims to reclaim land just off East Coast Park stretching from Marina East to Changi, as a means of protecting the country's eastern region, most of which is projected to become flood-prone against the backdrop of sea-level rise.

The project was re-mentioned in 2023, following a proposal by the Ministry of National Development for coastal defences along the east coast. This proposal was framed as a less disruptive coastal protection measure than a conventional sea wall which also enabled a new reservoir to be created to serve Singapore's future water needs.

In 2026, as prior years began recording rising sea levels and increasing rainfall, preparation works for Long Island are slated to begin, with works expected to take decades.

== History ==
Long Island was first mooted by the chief planner and chief executive of the Urban Redevelopment Authority (URA), Liu Thai Ker, in its 1991 Concept Plan. The plan was to have 100,000 residents living on the reclaimed island. The island would stretch from Marina East to Changi, and reclaim 700 hectare of space from the sea off East Coast Park. It was envisioned to have an Mass Rapid Transit line or a Light Rail Transit line running through the line as an extension from Marina Bay MRT station by 2030. It was acknowledged then that projects in the Concept Plan would be subjected to market demand. In 1992, a Long Island Planning Competition was held jointly by URA and the Geography Teachers' Association for 30 teams of four secondary school students each. The competition saw two winning town planning designs by students from Hwa Chong Institution and Monk's Hill Secondary School which would break up the reclaimed land into two or three sections that would allow for better water circulation around the reclaimed area.

An aspect of climate change affecting Singapore is the rising sea levels as Singapore is a low-lying island with much of its coastal area be eventually flooded as the sea edges inland. A 2022 report indicated that the mean sea level is project to rise by 1 metre by 2100, with worse case scenarios that see 5 metres rise in sea levels. 30% of the island is less than 5 metres above the sea level and will be prone to flooding from the sea water. The Building and Construction Authority commissioned a Coastal Adaptation Study in 2013, and completed in 2019, in which identified that the City-East Coast stretch of coast is more vulnerable to a flood event.

In 2021, the Public Utilities Board embarked on site-specific studies of the potential defences to adopt for each of the coastal areas identified in the BCA report. In November 2023 a proposal was put forth by Ministry of National Development, in which approximately 800 ha (2,000 acres) of land (around twice the land area of Marina Bay) will be reclaimed at the coastline of East Coast Park to create an elevated stretch of land consisting of 3 tracts of land, one of them being an islet, as well as an reservoir. The proposal aims to protect against mean sea level rise that could reach 1m by 2100, with peaks of potentially 4-5m due to high tides and storm surges, be a less disruptive coastal protection measure than a combination of a 3m sea wall, 12 tidal gates and pumping stations occupying 15 football fields of space along East Coast Park, and create a new reservoir for Singapore's water needs.

Since at least 2024, East Coast Park had experienced coastal flooding. On 30 March 2026, the Urban Development Authority announced that "preparatory works" would commence shortly. This includes drawing up a timeline to remove wrecks on the sea floor and the transportation of materials into the vicinity of the reclamation project. Environmentalists also raised concerns that the reclamation will be done close to where turtles nest and the biodiversity hot spots in the Southern Islands that are 10 km away and called for their protections. Authorities had carried out an environmental study of the affected area since 2024, and had identified that the risk to the biodiversity areas during the preparatory phase is minimal. The nesting areas that the turtles use near the Bedok Jetty would be relocated to the Sisters' Islands progressively. A second environmental study for the reclamation is being conducted as of June 2026. By the end of 2026, the first of two preparatory phases will start, with the 7km stretch of waters west of the Bedok Jetty being worked on first and the second phase beginning after the completion of the 2029 Southeast Asian Games.
