= Build-to-Order (Singapore) =

Real estate development scheme

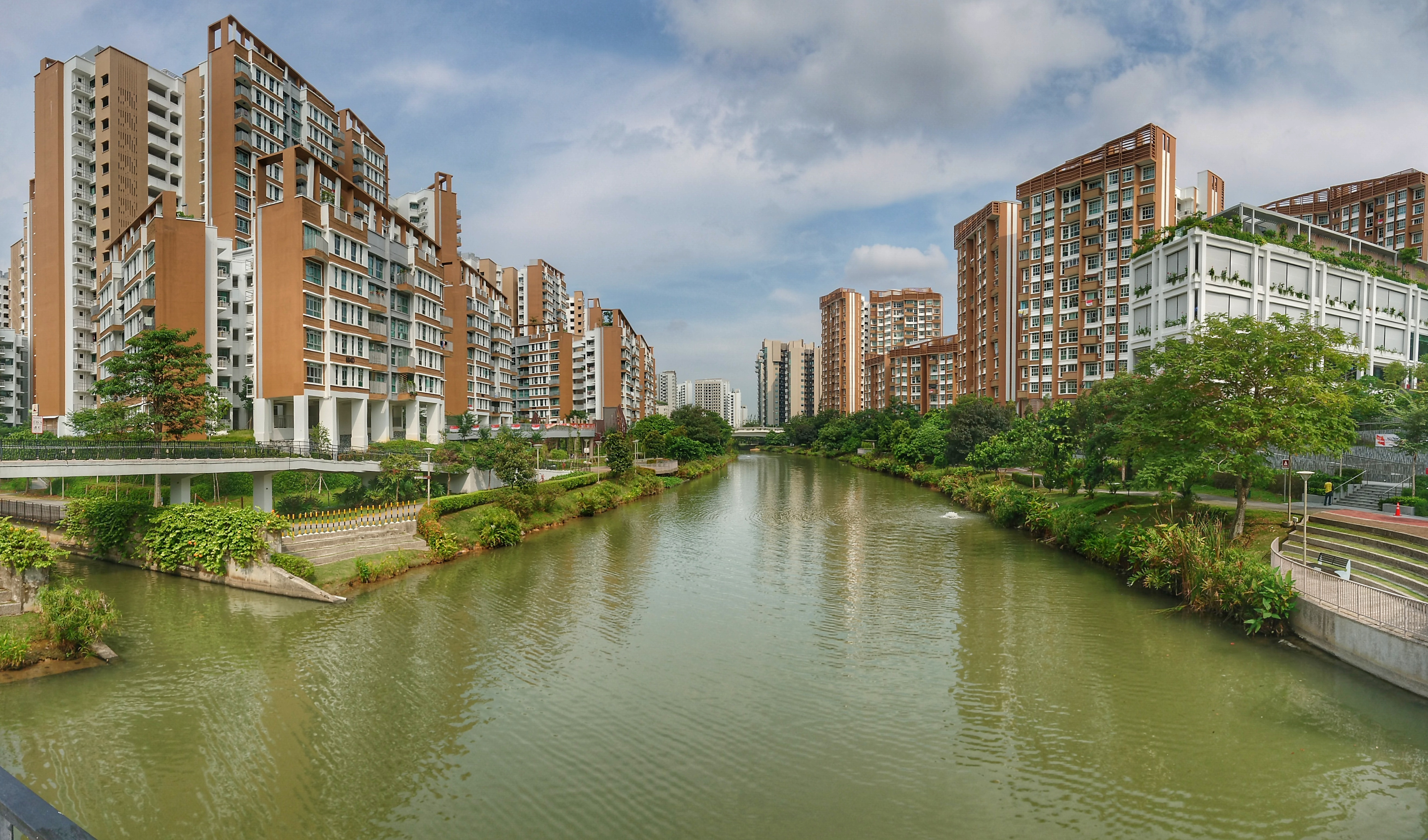
BTO residences in the North-East Region of Punggol

Build to order (BTO) is a real estate development scheme enacted by the Housing and Development Board (HDB), a statutory board responsible for Singapore's public housing. First introduced in 2001, it was a flat allocation system that offered flexibility in timing and location for owners buying new public housing in the country.

Under the scheme, Singaporeans select and apply for an apartment in their preferred location(s) from a list of launch sites. The scheme subsequently evolved, and the HDB now builds flats in advance of demand.

== History ==
In 2001, HDB first introduced BTO to replace the Registration for Flats System (RFS) scheme whereby the waiting time for new flat applicants was relatively shorter because flats were built ahead of demand. In comparison, the new BTO system requires a waiting period of about 3–4 years instead as such a system removes the need for the government to make projections ahead of demand. In 2002, the RFS scheme was discontinued.

In 2005, HDB introduced the design, build, and sell scheme (DBSS) which was then discontinued in 2011.

In the 2020s,HDB had commenced construction for housing projects in advance of public demand.

In October 2024, HDB chief executive Tan Meng Dui explained that construction work for project sites may begin months, and in some cases more than a year, before the actual launch of the project.

== BTO projects ==
The demand for BTO flats was low in the first years, resulting in the cancellation of 5 projects as they did not meet the requirement of minimum 70% application ratio.
