= Singapore Centre for Chinese Language =

The establishment of Singapore Centre for Chinese Language (Abbreviation: SCCL; Chinese: 新加坡華文教研中心; pinyin: xīn jiā pō huá wén jiào yán zhōng xīn) was announced by Singapore Prime Minister Lee Hsien Loong on 6 September 2008, and was opened by then Minister Mentor Lee Kuan Yew on 17 November 2009. The Centre was established to position Singapore as a centre of excellence for the learning, teaching and educational research of the Chinese language in a bilingual context.

Jointly set up by the Ministry of Education (Singapore) and National Institute of Education, SCCL is an autonomous centre within Nanyang Technological University, Singapore, signifying the collaborative efforts of the Singapore government, its professional teachers' training institute and academia in Chinese language education.

== Training ==
Singapore Centre for Chinese Language (SCCL) started its in-service training courses in June 2009. It aims to enhance the teaching literacy, competency and professionalism of Chinese language teachers. To date, SCCL has provided training for more than 30,000 Chinese language teachers.

To create further education opportunities for Chinese language teachers, SCCL and the University of Hong Kong jointly offer the Master in Teaching and Learning Chinese Language programme and the Doctor of Education in Research in Chinese Language Education programme. SCCL also collaborates with SUSS and SEED Institute to offer the Bachelor of Arts Degree in Chinese Language Education programme.

The Singapore University of Social Sciences (SUSS) and SCCL signed a Memorandum of Understanding (MOU) to collaborate in the SUSS School of Humanities and Behavioural Sciences's BA Chinese Language Education Programme (BACLE).

== Research ==
Singapore Centre for Chinese Language is dedicated to research studies that are closely associated with the teaching and learning of Chinese language. Keeping in mind the "Research-Validate-Train (RVT)" spirit, SCCL develops innovative pedagogies and publishes academic books and teaching toolkits to meet the rising challenges in teaching and learning Chinese in Singapore. SCCL also strives to provide Chinese language teachers and students with resources, platforms and applications that cater to their daily teaching and learning needs.

== Publication ==
The NTU-SCCL Press was set up in May 2012 to further SCCL's objectives of advancing research in Chinese Language pedagogy and promoting the development of Chinese language, culture and literature in Singapore. Its publications include academic books and monographs (pedagogy), journals, reference books, readers for children and teaching toolkits. In addition, the international-referred Journal of Chinese Language Education (JCLE) published by the SCCL and the Singapore Chinese Teachers' Union (SCTU) has been officially on the list of journals under the prestigious Chinese Social Sciences Citation Index (CSSCI) (Overseas) since January 2014.

== International Conference on Teaching and Learning of Chinese as a Second Language ==
To promote research in the field of teaching and learning Chinese as a second language and to facilitate the application of research findings, SCCL has been organising International Conference on Teaching and Learning Chinese as a Second Language on a biennial basis since 2009.
