= Subzones of Singapore =

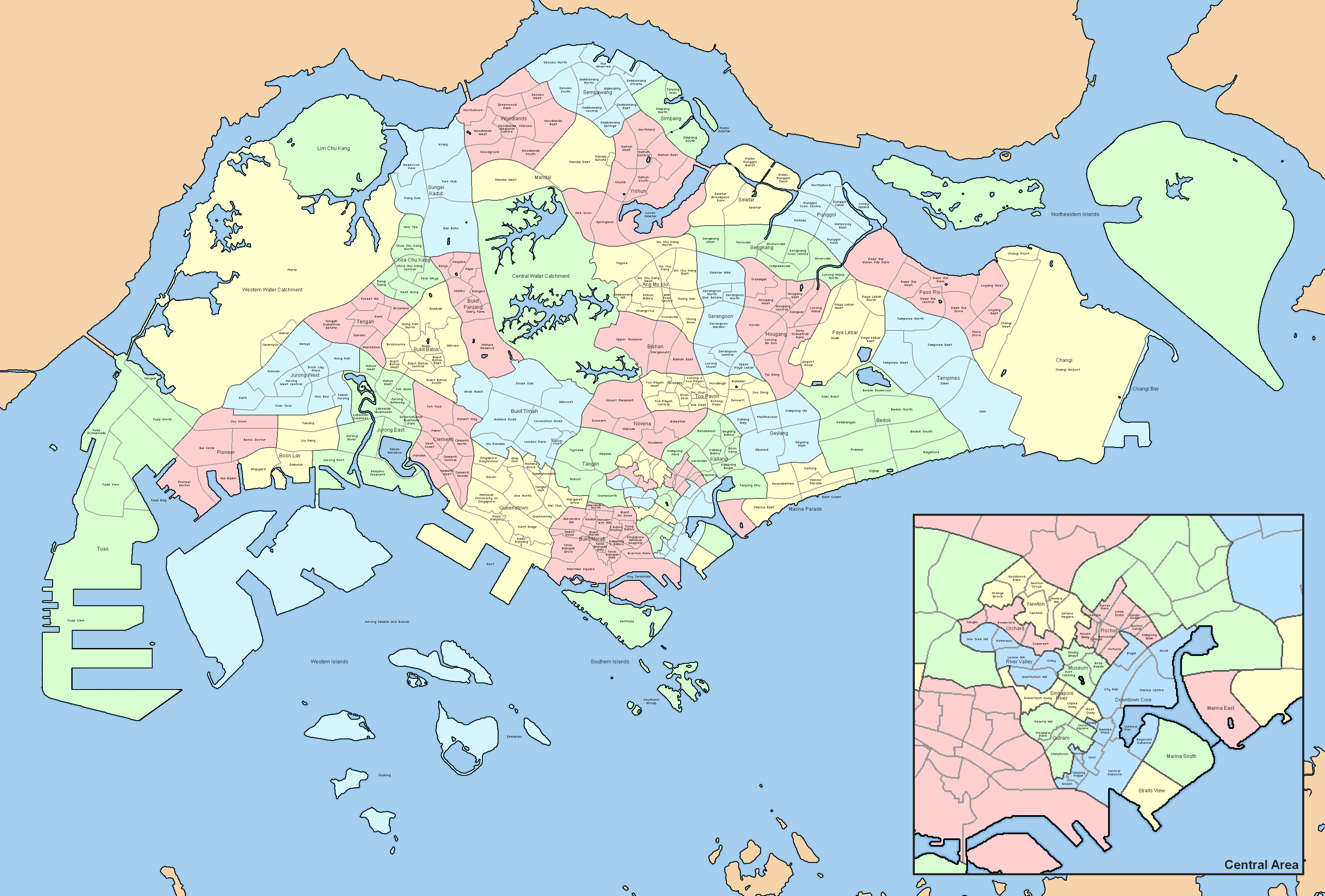
The subzones of Singapore

The subzones of Singapore represent the lowest level of urban planning and census divisions in Singapore, as designated by the Urban Redevelopment Authority (URA). Each subzone is part of a planning area, which in turn is grouped under one of the five main regions of the country.

There are 55 planning areas in total.

Both planning areas and subzones are listed below in alphabetical order. Population data is accurate as of June 2018, which does not necessarily reflect the same boundaries as in the 2019 Master Plan. Additionally, the figures include citizens and permanent residents, but do not include the approximately 1.6 million non-permanent residents of Singapore.

== Central Region ==
The Central Region of Singapore is made up of 22 planning areas, of which 10 form the Central Area. The region comprises 135 subzones in total. Planning areas that are part of the Central Area are italicised.

Planning Area	Subzone	Estimated population (2018)	Remarks
Bishan	Bishan East	28,750	
Bishan	Marymount	30,250	
Bishan	Upper Thomson	29,490	
Bukit Merah	Alexandra Hill	14,240	
Bukit Merah	Alexandra North	1,410	
Bukit Merah	Bukit Ho Swee	15,150	
Bukit Merah	Bukit Merah	1,130	
Bukit Merah	City Terminals	30	
Bukit Merah	Depot Road	6,390	
Bukit Merah	Everton Park	8,420	
Bukit Merah	Henderson Hill	11,510	
Bukit Merah	Kampong Tiong Bahru	9,470	
Bukit Merah	Maritime Square	3,200	
Bukit Merah	Redhill	12,100	
Bukit Merah	Singapore General Hospital	10	
Bukit Merah	Telok Blangah Drive	17,940	
Bukit Merah	Telok Blangah Rise	12,650	
Bukit Merah	Telok Blangah Way	9,790	
Bukit Merah	Tiong Bahru	12,800	
Bukit Merah	Tiong Bahru Station	15,660	
Bukit Timah	Anak Bukit	22,090	
Bukit Timah	Coronation Road	6,390	
Bukit Timah	Farrer Court	6,240	
Bukit Timah	Hillcrest	9,120	
Bukit Timah	Holland Road	10,630	
Bukit Timah	Leedon Park	6,460	
Bukit Timah	Swiss Club	5,620	
Bukit Timah	Ulu Pandan	10,730	
Downtown Core	Anson	80	
Downtown Core	Bayfront	0	
Downtown Core	Bugis	840	
Downtown Core	Cecil	220	
Downtown Core	Central Boulevard	630	
Downtown Core	City Hall	60	
Downtown Core	Clifford Pier	0	
Downtown Core	Marina Centre	10	
Downtown Core	Maxwell	0	
Downtown Core	Nicoll	-	Added in 2019.
Downtown Core	Phillip	0	
Downtown Core	Raffles Place	60	
Downtown Core	Tanjong Pagar	600	
Geylang	Aljunied	39,990	
Geylang	Geylang East	31,180	
Geylang	Kallang Way	50	
Geylang	Kampong Ubi	12,340	
Geylang	MacPherson	28,050	
Kallang	Bendemeer	35,980	
Kallang	Boon Keng	12,230	
Kallang	Crawford	8,960	
Kallang	Geylang Bahru	11,950	
Kallang	Kallang Bahru	20	
Kallang	Kampong Bugis	820	
Kallang	Kampong Java	10,710	
Kallang	Lavender	9,710	
Kallang	Tanjong Rhu	11,060	
Marina East	Marina East	0	
Marina South	Marina South	0	
Marine Parade	East Coast	0	
Marine Parade	Katong	9,380	
Marine Parade	Marina East	0	
Marine Parade	Marine Parade	27,550	
Marine Parade	Mountbatten	10,330	
Museum	Bras Basah	10	
Museum	Dhoby Ghaut	240	
Museum	Fort Canning	170	
Newton	Cairnhill	3,690	
Newton	Goodwood Park	1,140	
Newton	Istana Negara	40	
Newton	Monk's Hill	970	
Newton	Newton Circus	220	
Newton	Orange Grove	1,580	
Novena	Balestier	32,370	
Novena	Dunearn	3,880	
Novena	Malcolm	2,810	
Novena	Moulmein	9,190	
Novena	Mount Pleasant	700	
Orchard	Boulevard	430	
Orchard	Somerset	140	
Orchard	Tanglin	430	
Outram	China Square	1,460	
Outram	Chinatown	10,930	
Outram	Pearl's Hill	7,340	
Outram	People's Park	300	
Queenstown	Commonwealth	7,420	
Queenstown	Dover	11,290	
Queenstown	Ghim Moh	13,550	
Queenstown	Holland Drive	13,170	
Queenstown	Kent Ridge	840	
Queenstown	Margaret Drive	15,000	
Queenstown	Mei Chin	15,810	
Queenstown	National University of Singapore	230	
Queenstown	one-north	650	
Queenstown	Pasir Panjang 1	4,370	
Queenstown	Pasir Panjang 2	3,290	
Queenstown	Port	110	
Queenstown	Queensway	290	
Queenstown	Singapore Polytechnic	110	
Queenstown	Tanglin Halt	11,750	
River Valley	Institution Hill	3,500	
River Valley	Leonie Hill	2,830	
River Valley	One Tree Hill	1,920	
River Valley	Oxley	1,460	
River Valley	Paterson	220	
Rochor	Bencoolen	1,280	
Rochor	Farrer Park	2,830	
Rochor	Kampong Glam	160	
Rochor	Little India	3,460	
Rochor	Mackenzie	130	
Rochor	Mount Emily	1,330	
Rochor	Rochor Canal	0	
Rochor	Selegie	220	
Rochor	Sungei Road	2,140	
Rochor	Victoria	1,910	
Singapore River	Boat Quay	130	
Singapore River	Clarke Quay	140	
Singapore River	Robertson Quay	2,710	
Southern Islands	Sentosa	1,800	
Southern Islands	Southern Group	0	
Straits View	Straits View	0	
Tanglin	Chatsworth	6,490	
Tanglin	Nassim	9,440	
Tanglin	Ridout	1,390	
Tanglin	Tyersall	3,650	
Toa Payoh	Bidadari	0	
Toa Payoh	Boon Teck	13,600	
Toa Payoh	Braddell	10,040	
Toa Payoh	Joo Seng	7,980	Formerly called Paya Lebar.
Toa Payoh	Kim Keat	8,290	
Toa Payoh	Lorong 8 Toa Payoh	7,510	Formerly called Kallang.
Toa Payoh	Pei Chun	10,790	
Toa Payoh	Potong Pasir	11,310	
Toa Payoh	Sennett	5,410	
Toa Payoh	Toa Payoh Central	28,860	
Toa Payoh	Toa Payoh West	14,290	Formerly called Marymount.
Toa Payoh	Woodleigh	2,420	
Total		926,040	

== East Region ==
The East Region of Singapore consists of 6 planning areas, comprising 30 subzones in total. Tampines serves as the regional centre of the East Region.

Planning Area	Subzone	Estimated population (2018)	Remarks
Bedok	Bayshore	7,240	
Bedok	Bedok North	82,620	
Bedok	Bedok Reservoir	25,830	
Bedok	Bedok South	48,010	
Bedok	Frankel	34,030	
Bedok	Kaki Bukit	38,470	
Bedok	Kembangan	38,530	
Bedok	Siglap	6,570	
Changi	Changi Airport	0	
Changi	Changi Point	590	
Changi	Changi West	1,480	
Changi Bay	Changi Bay	0	
Pasir Ris	Flora Drive	14,650	
Pasir Ris	Loyang East	2,150	
Pasir Ris	Loyang West	180	
Pasir Ris	Pasir Ris Central	30,520	Formerly called Town.
Pasir Ris	Pasir Ris Drive	55,970	
Pasir Ris	Pasir Ris Park	7,280	
Pasir Ris	Pasir Ris Wafer Fab Park	20	Formerly called Pasir Ris West.
Pasir Ris	Pasir Ris West	36,140	Formerly called Elias.
Paya Lebar	Airport Road	0	
Paya Lebar	Paya Lebar East	10	
Paya Lebar	Paya Lebar North	20	
Paya Lebar	Paya Lebar West	0	
Paya Lebar	PLAB	0	
Tampines	Simei	39,450	
Tampines	Tampines East	130,980	
Tampines	Tampines North	8,040	
Tampines	Tampines West	79,670	
Tampines	Xilin	1,760	
Total		687,420	

== North Region ==
The North Region of Singapore is made up of 8 planning areas, comprising 41 subzones in total. Its regional centre is located at Woodlands.

Planning Area	Subzone	Estimated population (2018)	Remarks
Central Water Catchment	Central Water Catchment	0	
Lim Chu Kang	Lim Chu Kang	110	
Mandai	Mandai East	0	
Mandai	Mandai Estate	2,090	
Mandai	Mandai West	0	
Sembawang	Admiralty	14,160	
Sembawang	Sembawang Central	30,550	
Sembawang	Sembawang East	8,490	
Sembawang	Sembawang North	26,200	
Sembawang	Sembawang Springs	6,210	
Sembawang	Sembawang Straits	1,720	
Sembawang	Senoko North	20	
Sembawang	Senoko South	20	
Sembawang	The Wharves	0	
Simpang	Pulau Seletar	0	
Simpang	Simpang North	0	
Simpang	Simpang South	0	
Simpang	Tanjong Irau	0	
Sungei Kadut	Gali Batu	30	Formerly called Mandai.
Sungei Kadut	Kranji	10	
Sungei Kadut	Pang Sua	20	
Sungei Kadut	Reservoir View	20	
Sungei Kadut	Turf Club	690	
Woodlands	Greenwood Park	50	
Woodlands	Midview	35,960	
Woodlands	North Coast	12,900	
Woodlands	Senoko West	20	
Woodlands	Woodgrove	34,590	
Woodlands	Woodlands East	97,090	
Woodlands	Woodlands Regional Centre	10	
Woodlands	Woodlands South	41,150	
Woodlands	Woodlands West	30,770	
Yishun	Khatib	10,540	
Yishun	Lower Seletar	15,280	
Yishun	Nee Soon	890	
Yishun	Northland	29,070	
Yishun	Springleaf	4,230	
Yishun	Yishun Central	1,350	
Yishun	Yishun East	56,940	
Yishun	Yishun South	40,870	
Yishun	Yishun West	55,770	
Total		557,820	

== North-East Region ==
The North-East Region of Singapore is made up of 7 planning areas, comprising 48 subzones in total. There are plans to transform Seletar into the regional centre of the North-East Region in the future.

Planning Area	Subzone	Estimated population (2018)	Remarks
Ang Mo Kio	Ang Mo Kio Town Centre	4,820	
Ang Mo Kio	Cheng San	28,320	
Ang Mo Kio	Chong Boon	27,080	
Ang Mo Kio	Kebun Baru	22,970	
Ang Mo Kio	Sembawang Hills	6,760	
Ang Mo Kio	Shangri-La	16,560	
Ang Mo Kio	Tagore	8,110	Formerly called Sindo.
Ang Mo Kio	Townsville	21,900	
Ang Mo Kio	Yio Chu Kang	50	
Ang Mo Kio	Yio Chu Kang East	4,180	
Ang Mo Kio	Yio Chu Kang North	0	Formerly called Seletar.
Ang Mo Kio	Yio Chu Kang West	24,960	
Hougang	Defu Industrial Park	20	
Hougang	Hougang Central	4,730	
Hougang	Hougang East	25,020	
Hougang	Hougang West	46,300	
Hougang	Kangkar	30,300	
Hougang	Kovan	25,730	Formerly called Rosyth.
Hougang	Lorong Ah Soo	32,480	
Hougang	Lorong Halus	0	Formerly called Sungei Serangoon.
Hougang	Tai Seng	14,190	Formerly called Tai Keng.
Hougang	Trafalgar	44,240	
North-Eastern Islands	North-Eastern Islands	50	
Punggol	Coney Island	0	
Punggol	Matilda	47,930	
Punggol	Northshore	270	
Punggol	Punggol Canal	0	
Punggol	Punggol Field	48,380	
Punggol	Punggol Town Centre	17,490	
Punggol	Waterway East	47,500	
Seletar	Pulau Punggol Barat	0	
Seletar	Pulau Punggol Timor	0	
Seletar	Seletar	230	
Seletar	Seletar Aerospace Park	20	
Sengkang	Anchorvale	43,740	Formerly called Buangkok.
Sengkang	Compassvale	21,160	Formerly called Trafalgar.
Sengkang	Fernvale	53,810	Formerly called Jalan Kayu East.
Sengkang	Lorong Halus North	0	Formerly called Sungei Serangoon East.
Sengkang	Rivervale	60,660	Formerly called Sungei Serangoon West.
Sengkang	Sengkang Town Centre	61,270	
Sengkang	Sengkang West	10	Formerly called Jalan Kayu West.
Serangoon	Lorong Chuan	8,520	
Serangoon	Seletar Hills	13,920	
Serangoon	Serangoon Central	25,160	
Serangoon	Serangoon Garden	37,260	
Serangoon	Serangoon North	16,240	
Serangoon	Serangoon North Industrial Estate	10	
Serangoon	Upper Paya Lebar	16,200	
Total		908,550	

== West Region ==
The West Region of Singapore consists of 12 planning areas, comprising 79 subzones in total. The regional centre of the West Region is Jurong East.

Planning Area	Subzone	Estimated population (2018)	Remarks
Boon Lay	Liu Fang	10	
Boon Lay	Samulun	10	
Boon Lay	Shipyard	10	
Boon Lay	Tukang	10	
Bukit Batok	Brickworks	5,080	
Bukit Batok	Bukit Batok Central	26,630	
Bukit Batok	Bukit Batok East	13,280	
Bukit Batok	Bukit Batok West	15,030	
Bukit Batok	Bukit Batok South	15,440	
Bukit Batok	Gombak	10,080	
Bukit Batok	Guilin	13,110	
Bukit Batok	Hillview	18,980	
Bukit Batok	Hong Kah North	26,800	
Bukit Panjang	Bangkit	22,920	
Bukit Panjang	Dairy Farm	6,730	
Bukit Panjang	Fajar	28,490	
Bukit Panjang	Jelebu	31,940	
Bukit Panjang	Nature Reserve	3,790	
Bukit Panjang	Saujana	26,310	
Bukit Panjang	Senja	20,650	
Choa Chu Kang	Choa Chu Kang Central	21,500	
Choa Chu Kang	Choa Chu Kang North	32,900	Formerly called Kranji North and Pang Sua.
Choa Chu Kang	Keat Hong	32,750	
Choa Chu Kang	Peng Siang	33,690	
Choa Chu Kang	Teck Whye	25,260	
Choa Chu Kang	Yew Tee	41,420	
Clementi	Clementi Central	13,840	
Clementi	Clementi North	29,510	
Clementi	Clementi West	15,810	
Clementi	Clementi Woods	15,750	
Clementi	Faber	5,880	
Clementi	Pandan	10	
Clementi	Sunset Way	6,020	
Clementi	Toh Tuck	20	
Clementi	West Coast	6,170	
Jurong East	International Business Park	10	
Jurong East	Jurong Gateway	430	Formerly called Regional Centre.
Jurong East	Jurong Port	0	
Jurong East	Jurong River	10	
Jurong East	Lakeside (Business)	0	Lakeside (Business) and Lakeside (Leisure) was a single subzone as of 2018
Jurong East	Lakeside (Leisure)	1,070	Lakeside (Business) and Lakeside (Leisure) was a single subzone as of 2018
Jurong East	Penjuru Crescent	10	
Jurong East	Teban Gardens	19,270	
Jurong East	Toh Guan	15,200	
Jurong East	Yuhua East	25,460	
Jurong East	Yuhua West	19,920	Formerly called Boon Lay.
Jurong West	Boon Lay Place	30,200	
Jurong West	Chin Bee	10	
Jurong West	Hong Kah	54,880	
Jurong West	Jurong West Central	65,720	
Jurong West	Kian Teck	50	
Jurong West	Taman Jurong	38,660	
Jurong West	Wenya	8,360	
Jurong West	Yunnan	68,840	
Pioneer	Benoi Sector	10	
Pioneer	Gul Basin	20	
Pioneer	Gul Circle	30	
Pioneer	Joo Koon	30	
Pioneer	Pioneer Sector	0	
Tengah	Brickland	12,700	
Tengah	Forest Hill	12,700	
Tengah	Garden	12,700	
Tengah	Park	12,700	
Tengah	Plantation	12,700	
Tengah	Tengah Industrial Estate	12,700	
Tuas	Tengeh	0	
Tuas	Tuas Bay	10	
Tuas	Tuas North	40	Formerly called Pioneer.
Tuas	Tuas Promenade	0	
Tuas	Tuas View	20	
Tuas	Tuas View Extension	10	Formerly called Coast.
Western Islands	Jurong Island and Bukom	10	
Western Islands	Semakau	0	
Western Islands	Sudong	0	
Western Water Catchment	Bahar	0	
Western Water Catchment	Cleantech	0	
Western Water Catchment	Murai	640	
Total		914,640	

== See also ==
- Administrative divisions of Singapore
  - Subdivisions of Singapore
  - Constituencies of Singapore
- Urban planning in Singapore
  - Regions of Singapore
  - Urban planning areas in Singapore
- Urban renewal in Singapore
  - Future developments in Singapore
  - Land reclamation in Singapore
- Geography of Singapore
