= Administrative divisions of Singapore =

Singapore is a unitary state without provinces or states, but it has been subdivided in various ways for administrative and urban planning purposes. As of 2022, Singapore has a land area of approximately 800 km^{2} (310 sq mi). The country is generally organised into five regions (level 1), 55 planning areas (level 2) and 332 subzones (level 3).

These divisions are primarily based on the Urban Redevelopment Authority (URA) Master Plan. The five regions group together the planning areas for broad urban planning purposes. The planning areas, introduced in the 1990s, form the basis for several government functions. The Department of Statistics adopted them for the 2000 national census, and the Singapore Police Force (SPF) uses them as a general guide when demarcating the boundaries of its Neighbourhood Police Centres (NPCs).

Beyond the planning areas, Singapore is also divided into 64 survey districts for land administration. These include 34 mukim, which were originally rural districts, and 30 town subdivisions. Historically, these subdivisions have been based on postal districts, especially during the colonial era. When local elections necessitated the setting up of electoral districts, however, it began to supplement postal districts as an alternative form of local governance, since each electoral district is headed by a member of parliament who represents and speaks for the respective electorates. Additionally, postal districts remain in use, with the current system introduced in 1995 numbering them from 01 to 83, although their significance has diminished with the rise of newer planning boundaries.

== Overview ==
=== Regions ===
- Central
- East
- North
- North–East
- West

=== Planning areas ===
Reference map for the planning areas of Singapore

== Other administrative and electoral divisions ==
=== Community Development Council districts ===
Community Development Council districts of Singapore
- Category: Unitary state
- Location: Republic of Singapore
- Created by: PA Act 1997
- Created: February 1997; 11 November 2001 (Finalised)
- Number: Five districts (as of 2015)
- Government: Community Development Council; National Government
- Subdivisions: Constituencies (Town Councils)

Established in 1997 by the PA Act, there were nine districts formerly, governed by nine different Community Development Councils (CDCs). In 2001, the nine districts and CDCs were then reformed into five, namely the North East CDC, North West CDC, South East CDC, South West CDC and Central Singapore CDC. Each district is then further divided into electoral constituencies and town councils.

The council boundaries follow that of the existing political divisions, with each handling between four and six GRCs and SMCs and roughly dividing the country's population into equal parts. Each CDC is managed by a Council, which in turn is headed by a mayor and has between 12 and 80 members. The members are appointed by the Chairman or Deputy Chairman of the People's Association.

The role of the CDCs is to initiate, plan and manage community programmes to promote community bonding and social cohesion within local communities. The electoral boundaries of Singapore are relatively fluid, and are reviewed prior to each general election. The districts are composed of the constituencies and electoral districts (the latter as of the 2015 General Elections).

There are currently five CDCs, namely the

- Central Singapore Community Development Council
- North East Community Development Council
- North West Community Development Council
- South East Community Development Council
- South West Community Development Council

=== Town councils ===
The first town councils were set up in September 1986 by the Town Councils Act, with the main purpose of estate management. Prior to the introduction of town councils, housing estates were managed by the Housing Development Board. As the estates were centrally managed, the standardised rules that the board had set for all housing estates made HDB towns monotonous in appearance and problems faced by residents in the different estates were not addressed fast enough.

Town councils boundaries are drawn based on electoral district boundaries. A town council area can consist of a Group Representation Constituency (GRC), a Single Member Constituency (SMC), or a collection of neighbouring GRCs and SMCs controlled by the same political party. The Members of Parliament head the town councils of their constituencies. Town councils boundaries do not correspond to new town boundaries; different parts of the same HDB town may be managed by different town councils.

=== Constituencies ===
Town councils are then further subdivided into different constituencies, which are classified as either Single Member Constituencies (SMCs) or Group Representation Constituencies (GRCs). The boundaries of the electoral constituencies are decided by the Elections Department, which is under the control of the Prime Minister's Office.

== See also ==
- Geography of Singapore
  - Constituencies of Singapore
  - List of electoral divisions and wards in Singapore
- Urban planning in Singapore
  - Regions of Singapore
    - Planning areas of Singapore
      - Subzones of Singapore
- Urban renewal in Singapore
  - Future developments in Singapore
  - Land reclamation in Singapore
