= Pulau Seletar =

Island in Singapore

Pulau Seletar (Seletar Island)
- Location within Singapore

Geography
- Location: Straits of Johor
- Coordinates: 1°26′33.18″N 103°51′45.3234″E
- Area: 38.5 ha (95 acres)

Administration
- Singapore

Pulau Seletar (or Seletar Island) is an island in Singapore waters, in the Straits of Johor off the northern coast. It has an area of 38.5 hectares. It is in a bay into which several streams flow, including the waters of mainland Singapore's only hot spring.

Pulau Seletar is in the planning area of Simpang, in which it forms a single subzone of its own.

The island is home to mangrove trees, the tallest of which reach a height of 80 feet.
