= Regions of Singapore =

Regions of Singapore Kawasan Singapura (Malay) 新加坡的地区 (Chinese) சிங்கப்பூர் பகுதிகள் (Tamil)
- The five regions shown in light blue (west), dark green (north), pink (central), yellow (north east) and light green (east). The dark pink area labelled "12" is the Central Area, the de facto capital of Singapore.
- Category: Unitary state
- Location: Singapore
- Created by: Urban Redevelopment Authority (URA)
- Created: September 1991 (proposed); 22 January 1999 (gazetted)
- Number: 5 (as of 2019)
- Populations: 582,330 (North Region) – 930,910 (North-East Region)
- Areas: 121.3 km^{2} (46.8 sq mi) (North-East Region) – 218.4 km^{2} (84.3 sq mi) (West Region)
- Government: National Government (Level 1) Community Development Council (CDC) Districts (Level 2) Town Councils (Level 3)
- Subdivisions: Planning Areas (Level 2) Subzones (Level 3)

The regions of Singapore serve as urban planning subdivisions of the country at the highest level as demarcated by the Urban Redevelopment Authority (URA) to support its planning work. Over time, other government agencies have also adopted these five regions for administrative purposes, such as the Department of Statistics in conducting censuses. Singapore's regions are further subdivided into 55 planning areas on the second level, which include two water catchment areas, and planning areas are further divided into subzones on the lowest level. The largest region in terms of area is the West Region with 218.4 km^{2} (84.3 sq mi), while the Central Region is the most populous with an estimated population of 922,980 inhabitants in the area in 2019.

The country is governed as a unitary state without provinces or states. While referenced by some government organisations, these regions are not formal administrative subdivisions but are mainly geographical in nature or used for urban planning. For local governance, Singapore is divided into five Community Development Council (CDC) districts on the second level, each headed by a mayor. These districts are made up of electoral constituencies, which are administered at the lowest level by town councils. A town council may oversee one or more constituencies, and its boundaries do not necessarily align with those of CDC districts. CDC mayors are not directly elected but are Members of Parliament (MPs) representing constituencies within their respective districts. (Note: For example, Denise Phua, who is the mayor of the Central Singapore District since 2014, is the MP for Jalan Besar GRC which is a GRC within that district.) Electoral boundaries can change with each general election, while regional and planning area boundaries have remained largely fixed.

== Regional centres ==
Before 1991, urban planning in Singapore prioritised a strong commercial core within the Central Area, which had functioned as the city's economic centre since the Jackson Plan. At the same time, residential areas were largely concentrated in the north and east while industrial zones were mainly located in the west. This spatial separation meant that many Singaporeans had to travel long distances across the island for work, shopping or daily activities. To mitigate these inefficiencies and improve the overall balance of development, the concept of regional centres was introduced under the 1991 Master Plan.

Internationally, regional centres are usually planned as new urban areas or largely self contained towns with a full range of urban functions. In Singapore, however, its limited land area of roughly 780 km^{2} (300 sq mi) gives the term a more localised meaning. A regional centre functions as a secondary downtown that sits between town centres in new residential towns and the main central business district (CBD) within the Central Area. These centres are intended to provide a wide range of commercial, retail, leisure and community facilities for surrounding residents. They are located in areas with strong connectivity through the Mass Rapid Transit (MRT) system, an efficient bus system and an extensive road network. The broader objective of regional centres is to decentralise amenities that were previously concentrated in the city-centre.

There are currently four regional centres in Singapore, first identified in the 1991 Master Plan. There is no designated regional centre for the Central Region, as the city-centre itself functions de facto as one. The first regional centre to be developed was Tampines, located in the east. This was followed by Jurong East in the west, with parts of the area also known as the Jurong Lake District (JLD). Woodlands in the north was made a regional centre. Plans for Seletar in the north-east have yet to be formally announced and, in the interim, Punggol functions de facto as the regional centre for the north-east, including the Punggol Digital District (PDD).

== List of regions ==

Region	Regional centre	Largest PA by area	Largest PA by population	Area (km^{2})	Estimated Population	Population density (/km^{2})	Planning Areas
Central Region	None (de jure); Central Area (de facto)	Queenstown	Bukit Merah	132.7	922,580 (Note: Population figures are for residents as of 30 June 2020. In Singapore, "residents" include citizens and permanent residents but do not include the approximately 1.6 million non-permanent residents of Singapore.)	6,952	22
East Region	Tampines	Changi	Bedok	128.3	685,890	7,367	6
North Region	Woodlands	Central Water Catchment	Woodlands	134.5	582,330	4,330	8
North-East Region	Seletar (de jure); Punggol (de facto)	North-Eastern Islands	Sengkang	121.3	930,910	8,960	9
West Region	Jurong East	Western Water Catchment	Jurong West	218.4	922,540	4,583	12
Total				735.2	4,044,250	6,077	55

== See also ==
- Administrative divisions of Singapore
- Urban planning in Singapore
- Urban renewal in Singapore
  - Future developments in Singapore
  - Land reclamation in Singapore
- Geography of Singapore
