= Henderson Hill, Singapore =

Henderson Hill
- Subzone of Bukit Merah Planning Area

Other transcription(s)
  - Chinese: 亨德申山
- Interactive map of Henderson Hill
- Coordinates: 1.287°N 103.823°E
- Country: Singapore
- Region: Central Region
- Planning Area: Bukit Merah

Henderson Hill (Chinese: 亨德申山) is a subzone within the planning area of Bukit Merah, Singapore, as defined by the Urban Redevelopment Authority (URA). Its boundary is composed of Alexandra Road in the north; Lower Delta Road in the east; Jalan Bukit Merah in the south; and the residential precinct along Redhill Close in the east.
