= North Region, Singapore =

North Region
- Region

Other transcription(s)
  - Malay: Wilayah Utara (Singapura)
  - Chinese: 北区 (新加坡)
  - Tamil: வடக்குப் பகுதி (சிங்கப்பூர்)
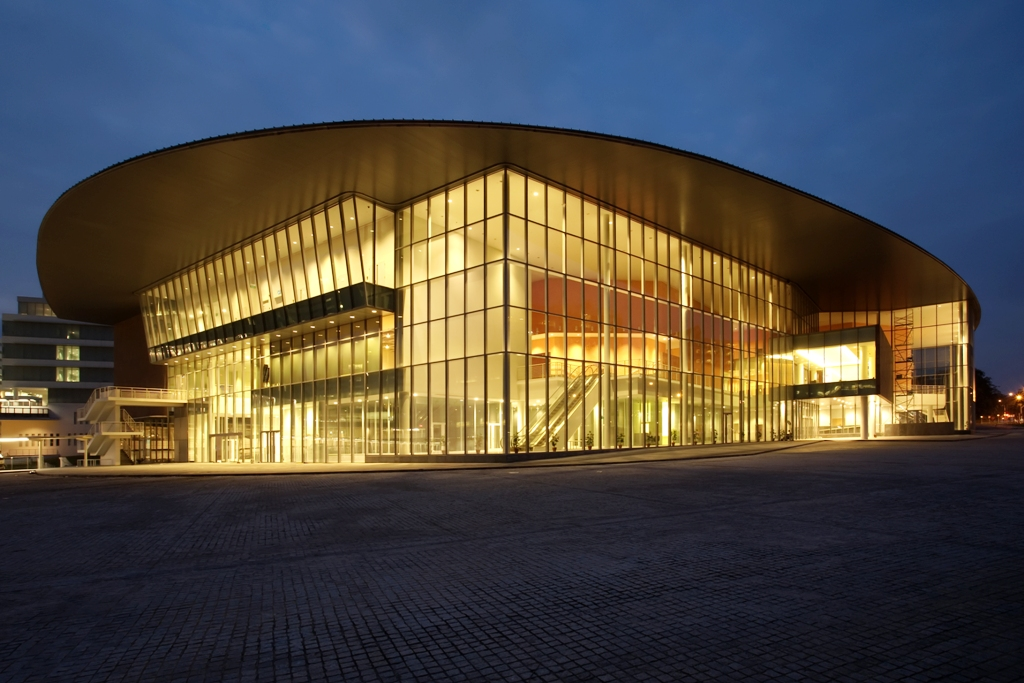
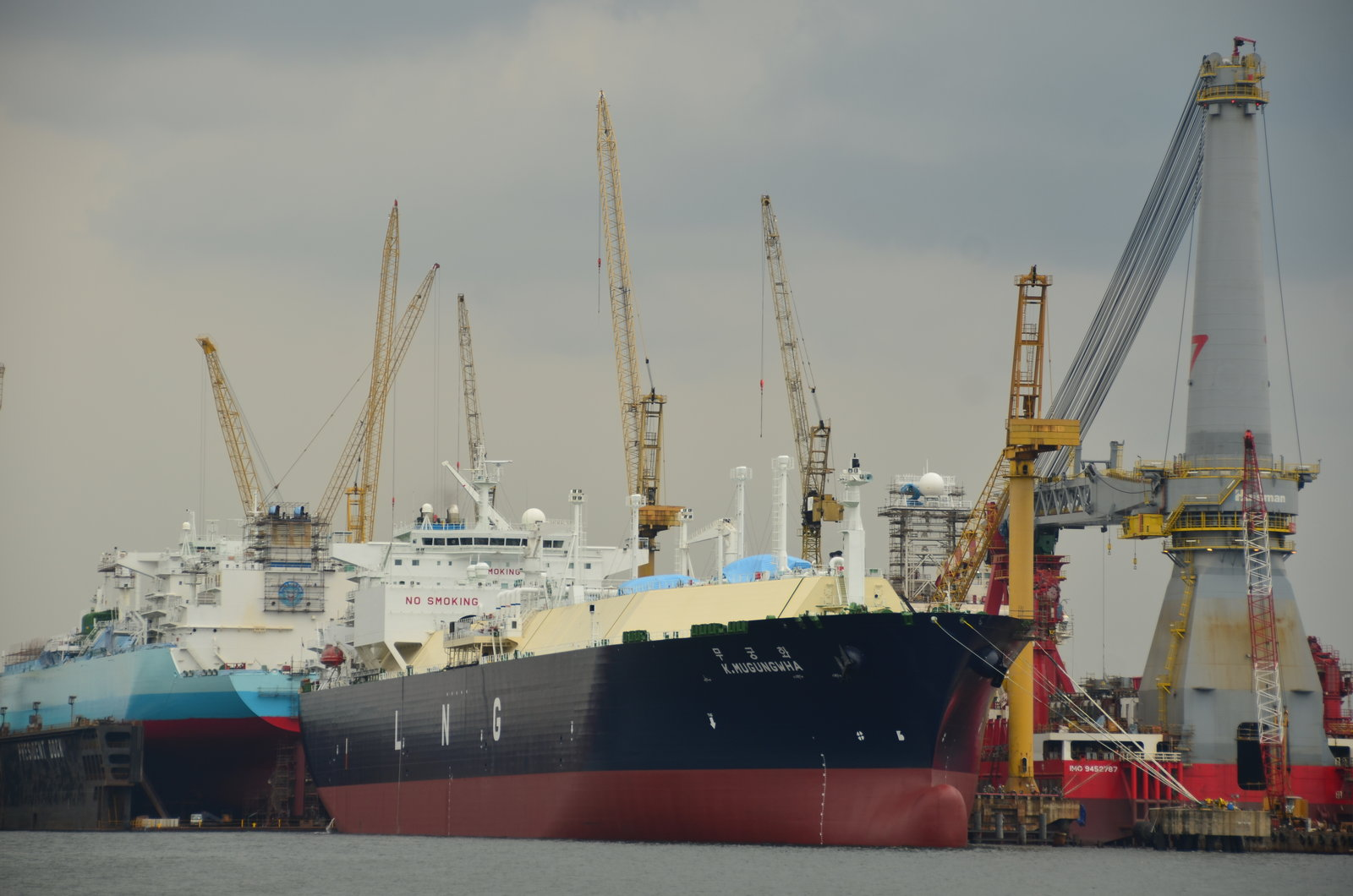
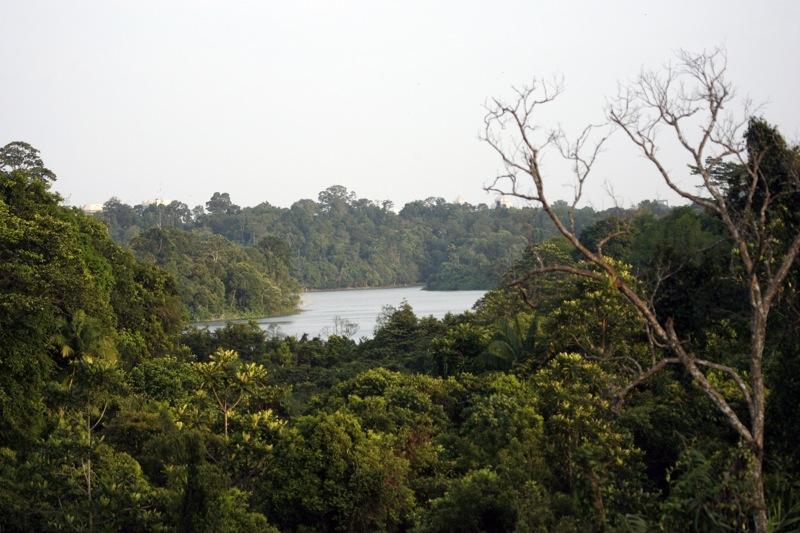
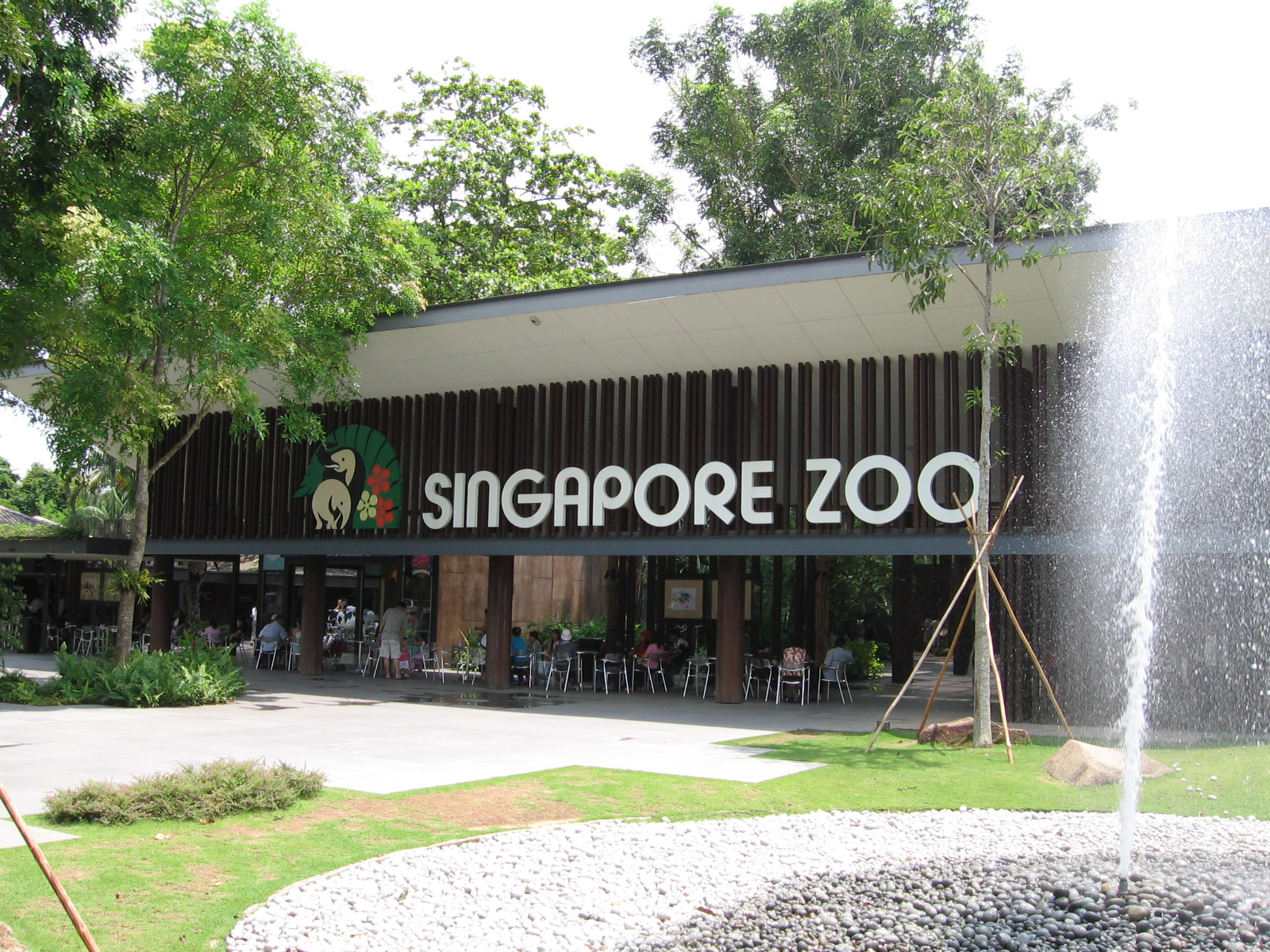
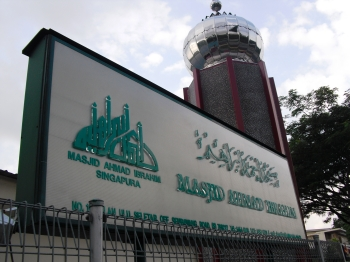
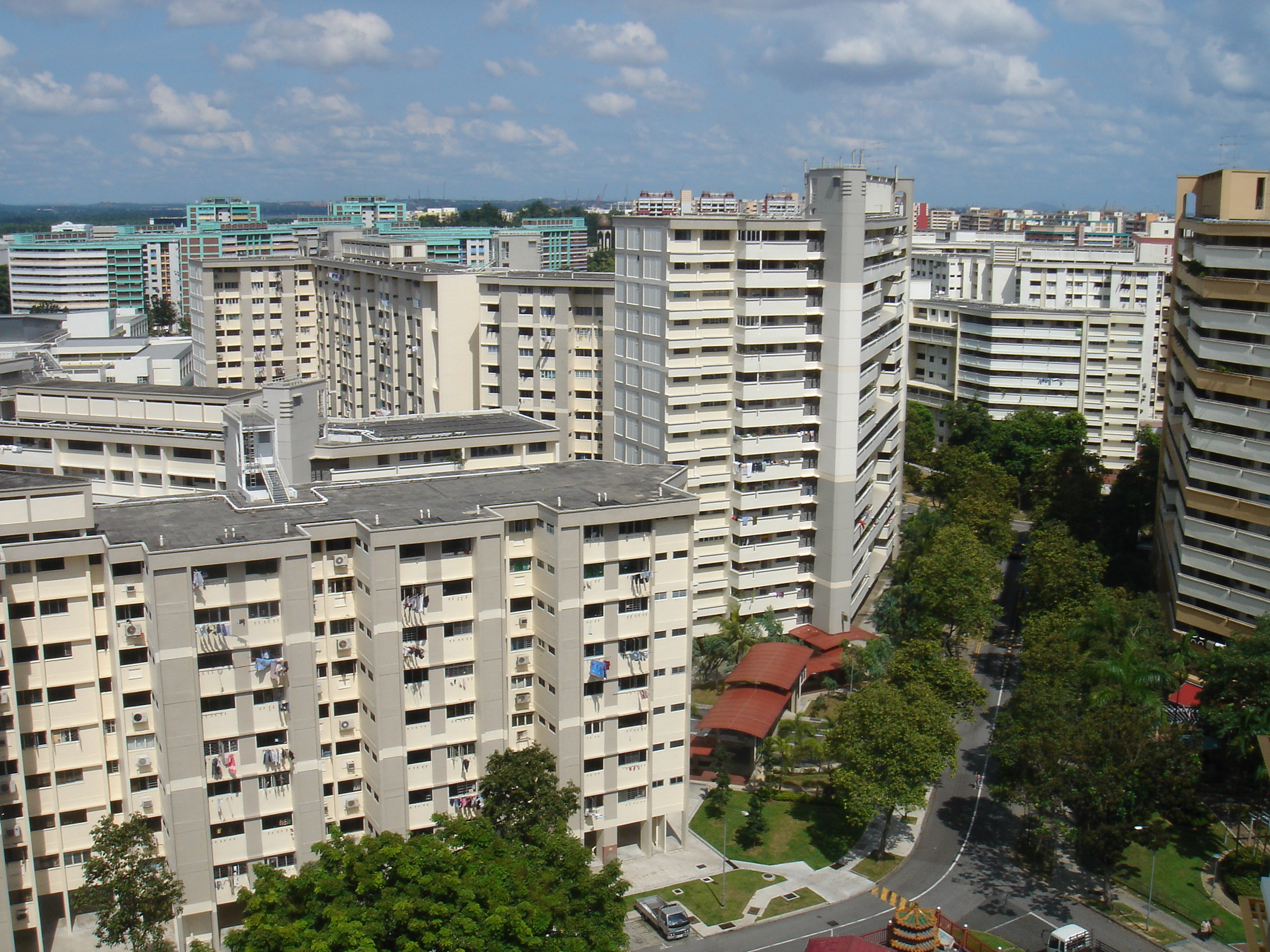
- From top left to right: Republic Polytechnic Cultural Centre, K. Mugungwha docked in Sembawang Shipyard, Central Water Catchment, Singapore Zoo, Masjid Ahmad Ibrahim, HDB flats in Yishun

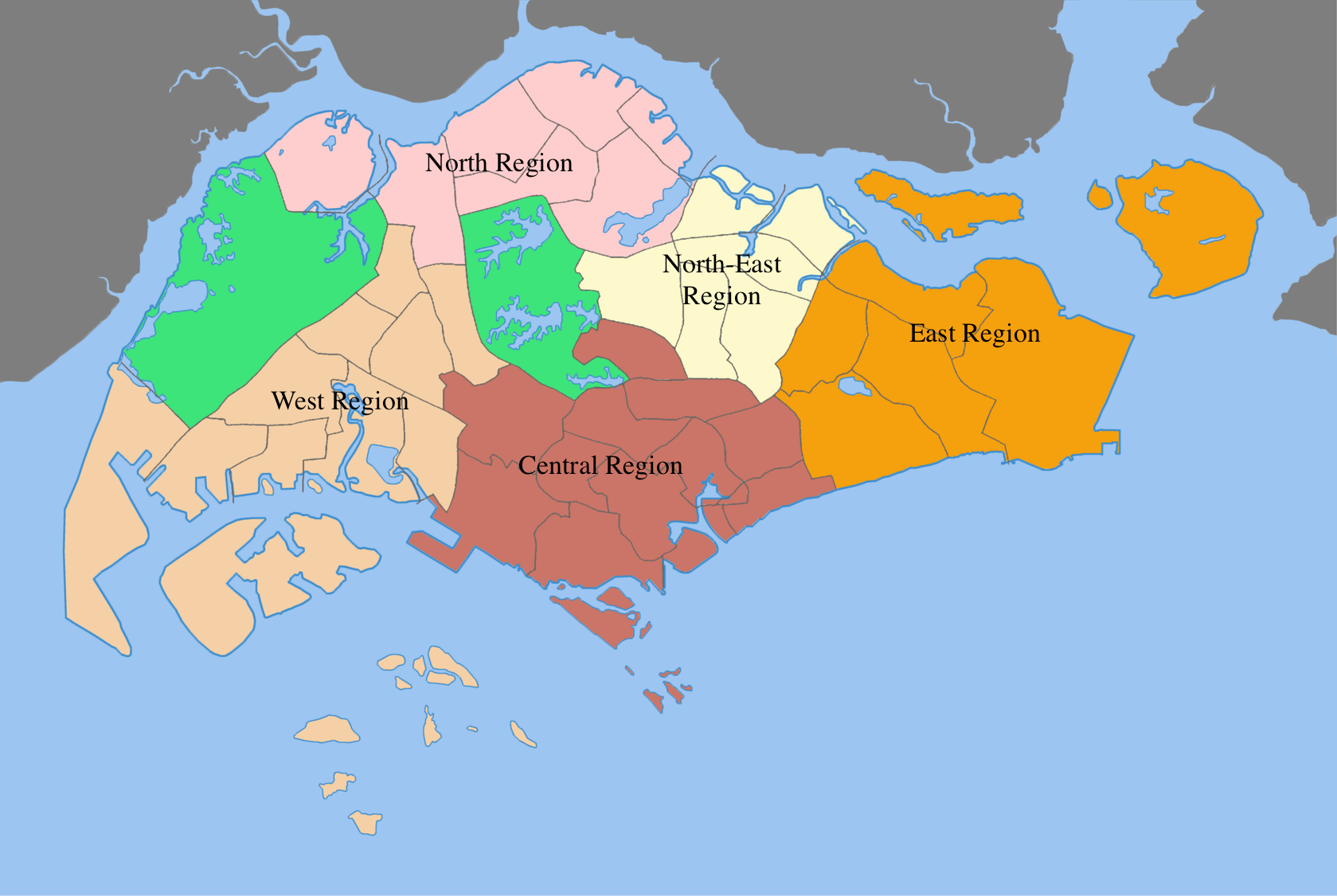
- North Region (in pink) including the Central Water Catchment (green in the middle)
- Coordinates: 1°26′10.57″N 103°47′12.14″E
- Country: Singapore
- Planning Areas: 8: Central Water Catchment; Lim Chu Kang; Mandai; Sembawang; Simpang; Sungei Kadut; Woodlands; Yishun
- CDC: North West CDC
- Regional centre (and largest PA): Woodlands

Government
  - Mayors: North West CDC: Alex Yam

Area
  - Total: 134.5 km^{2} (51.9 sq mi)

Population (2020)
  - Total: 582,330
  - Density: 4,330/km^{2} (11,210/sq mi)

The North Region is one of the five regions in the city-state of Singapore. The region is the second largest region in terms of land area, and has a population of 582,330. Woodlands is the regional centre and also the most populous town with 255,130 residents living in the area. Comprising 13,500 hectares of land area, it includes eight planning areas.

The relative isolation of the area from the Downtown Core meant relatively belated urban development and the greater abundance of natural greenery. Still, the region includes one of Singapore's largest new towns, Woodlands. Largely grouped into three new towns, it houses 129,000 residential housing units of various types, although public housing tends to dominate. Excluding naturally occurring green spaces, the region has 3 square kilometres of recreational spaces.

== History ==
=== Planning strategies ===
Planning considerations for the Singapore Master Plan 2003 involving the North Region took into consideration its existing strengths. With a good mix of various housing types, the region also has established industrial areas particularly in Sungei Kadut and Senoko which provide for employment opportunities close to the residential areas. Transportation, which used to be considered difficult, has been improved tremendously with the completion of the Bukit Timah and Seletar Expressways, and the introduction of the Mass Rapid Transit's North–South Line. There are adequate commercial facilities with the siting of the Woodlands Regional Centre in the area, as well as recreational facilities. In addition, there is an abundance of green spaces, untouched forests, and even farmland, which are a rarity in Singapore today.

The burgeoning population in Singapore meant more space could be reserved for residential housing in the region. The newly built Sembawang New Town will expand northwards to the Senoko Industrial area. Another new town will be built in Simpang.

In terms of commercial needs, the Woodlands Regional Centre will be further developed. Large tracts of land remain awaiting potential development, with the potential of even taping into the market of residents in Johor Bahru, Malaysia, across the Strait of Johor. More industrial areas to meet employment needs are also planned for the region.

Given the large tracts of virgin forests within the region, care will be taken to protect and enhance them. New parks and park connectors are planned for, and a new sports complex will be built in Sembawang New Town. Facilities built for the new Republic Polytechnic campus may also be opened for public use. On August 17, 2025, Prime Minister Lawrence Wong announced during the 2025 National Day rally plans for the redevelopment of Woodlands, Sembawang and Kranji. Under these plans, the existing Woodlands Checkpoint will be expanded to five times its current capacity to help ease congestion on the Johor–Singapore Causeway, while new housing estates will be built in all three towns.

== Geography ==
With a total land area of 134.5 km^{2} (51.9 sq mi), the region is situated on the northern corner of Singapore Island, bordering the North-East Region to the east, West Region to the south-west and the Straits of Johor to the north.

== Regime ==
The North Region is governed locally by the North West CDC and is divided into 8 planning areas.

=== Planning areas ===
| Planning Area | Area (km^{2}') | Population | Density (/km^{2}') |
|---|---|---|---|
| Central Water Catchment | 37.15 | 10 | 0.3 |
| Lim Chu Kang | 17.3 | 90 | 5.2 |
| Mandai | 11.77 | 2,120 | 180.2 |
| Sembawang | 12.34 | 76,530 | 6,203.3 |
| Simpang | 5.13 | 0 | 0 |
| Sungei Kadut | 15.99 | 850 | 53.2 |
| Woodlands | 13.59 | 250,290 | 18,424 |
| Yishun | 21.24 | 201,970 (Old) | 9,507.2 |

== Economy ==
=== Agriculture ===
The region supports Singapore's agricultural industry, with agricultural activity primarily concentrated in Lim Chu Kang. This district serves as the nation's main agricultural zone, housing a diverse range of farms engaged in food production, aquaculture, and agri-technology. The area is home to vegetable farms, egg production facilities, fish farms, and goat farms, many of which employ modern, high-efficiency farming techniques such as vertical farming, hydroponics, and automated systems. Sungei Tengah is another district that houses some of the country's agricultural activities. It is located within the Western Water Catchment area, a protected water catchment region in western Singapore. Parts of the area have historically been used for agricultural and farming activities due to its rural land use and low urban density.

In 2024, hen shell eggs, vegetable, and seafood farms contributed around 34%, 3%, and 6%, of Singapore's total food consumption respectively, with a total combined value of local food production estimated at S$231 million.

=== Sembawang Shipyard ===
Sembawang Shipyard is a shipyard that specialises in ship repairs and fabrication. Owned by SembCorp Marine, the shipyard has the deepest dry dock in Southeast Asia. Formerly a British naval base, the shipyard was built in 1938 as the Sembawang Naval Base. After Singapore's independence, the naval base was converted into a commercial shipyard under the management of Sembawang Corporation (now known as SembCorp).

=== Tourism ===
The region is home to several attractions, namely the Singapore Zoo, Night Safari, Bird Paradise and River Safari. In June 2016, it was announced that a 126 hectares (1.26 km^{2}) eco-tourism hub will be developed in Mandai. Together with the current zoological parks, the area will feature eco-friendly accommodations such as camps, tents, and family rooms. Jurong Bird Park has been relocated to the area as Bird Paradise, which opened in November 2023. The new bird park is also connected to a rainforest sanctuary.

== Education ==
Residents living within the area have access to different educational facilities ranging from preschools to primary and secondary schools, as these are located around the different towns in the East region. The area is also home to various tertiary institutions such as, Republic Polytechnic, Yishun Innova Junior College and a special education school, MINDS. There is also an international school, GEMS World Academy, located in Yishun.
