= Alexandra North =

- Subzone of Bukit Merah Planning Area

Other transcription(s)
  - Chinese: 亚历山大北
- Location within Singapore
- Coordinates: 1.29228°N 103.81998°E
- Country: Singapore
- Region: Central Region
- Planning Area: Bukit Merah

Alexandra North (Chinese: 亚历山大北) is a subzone within the planning area of Bukit Merah, Singapore, as defined by the Urban Redevelopment Authority (URA). Its boundary is made up of the Alexandra Canal and Prince Charles Square in the north; Tanglin Road in the west; Alexandra Road in the south; and Delta Road in the east.
