= Simpang =

- Planning Area

Other transcription(s)
  - Malay: Simpang (Rumi) سيمڤڠ (Jawi)
  - Chinese: 新邦; Xīnbāng (Pinyin); Sin-pang (Hokkien POJ)
  - Tamil: சிம்பாங் Cimpāṅ (Transliteration)
- Location of Simpang in Singapore
- Country: Singapore
- Region: North Region, Singapore

Government
  - Mayors: ----

Area
  - Total: 8.28 km^{2} (3.20 sq mi)

Population (2026)
  - Total: 0
  - Density: 0.0/km^{2} (0.0/sq mi)

Ethnic groups
- Postal district: 27
- Postal sector: 83

Simpang (IPA: /ˈsɪmpʌŋ/ SIM-pung) is a planning area located in the North Region of Singapore. The word Simpang means junction or intersection in Malay. It is situated north of Yishun, east of Sembawang and west of Seletar. Pulau Seletar is classified under Simpang planning area. Jalan Kuala Simpang was the main road serving the area. Sungei Simpang Kiri, Sungei Simpang Kanan and Simpang Kiri Park Connector retain and reflect the name of the area.

Simpang is currently a swamp area which is used by the Singapore Armed Forces as a training ground since the early 1996, after the plan of developing a "Simpang New Town" was rejected. In the original 1993 plan, the area was slated for 20,000 housing units in a low density. After the rejection and lull, there are plans for it to be converted into a high-density housing estate.

Simpang has four subzones for statistical and planning purposes: Pulau Seletar, Simpang North, Simpang South and Tanjong Irau.
