= Senoko =

- Subzone of Sembawang Planning Area

Name transcription(s)
  - Chinese: 圣诺哥
  - Pinyin: Shèngnuògē
  - Hokkien POJ: Sèng-lo̍k-ko
  - Malay: Senoko
  - Tamil: செனோக்கோ
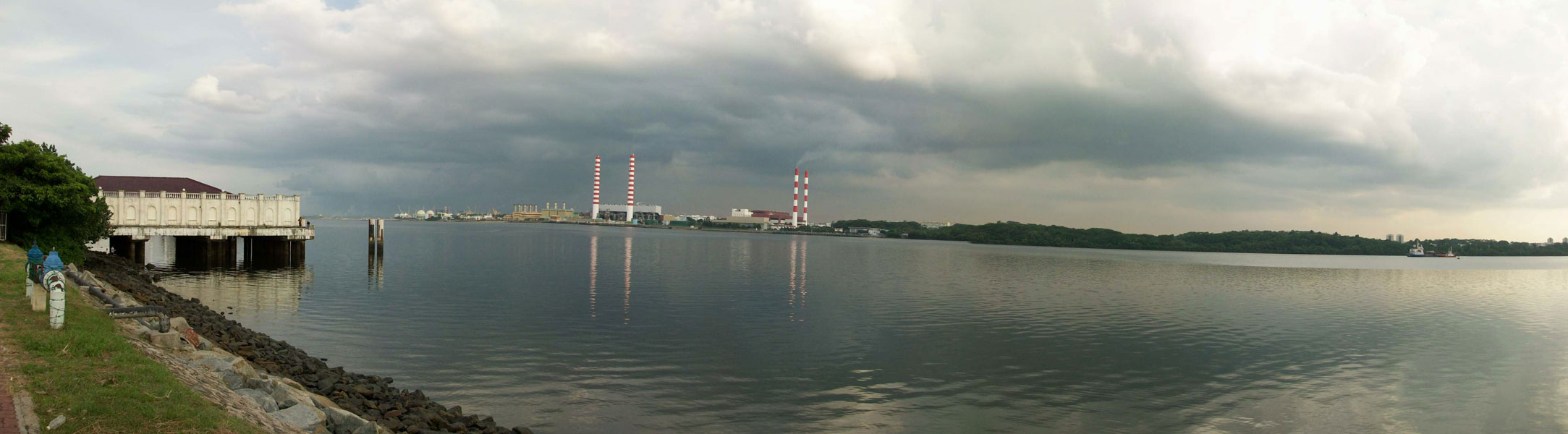
- Panorama view of Singapore Senoko power station
- Country: Singapore

Senoko (sə-NOH-koh) is an industrial area located in Sembawang, in the northern part of Singapore. It is best known for its power station and fishery port. It is also the eponym of the Senoko North and Senoko South subzones in Sembawang.

== Etymology ==
In Franklin and Jackson's Plan of Singapore (1830), the place name Senoko was found and referred to the "River Simko" or Sungei Senoko in Malay. The river has since been merged into Sungei Sembawang, which flows out of the mouth of the former Sungei Senoko.

== Transportation ==
Tower Transit Singapore's bus service 981 goes to Senoko Industrial Estate, while services 169 and 856 plies through Admiralty Road West.

The closest Mass Rapid Transit station is Woodlands North on the Thomson–East Coast Line, which will also be the future Singapore terminus of the RTS Link to Johor Bahru, Malaysia.
