= Planning areas of Singapore =

Main urban planning and census divisions of Singapore

Planning areas of Singapore Kawasan Perancangan Singapura (Malay) 新加坡规划区 (Chinese) சிங்கப்பூர் திட்டமிடல் பகுதி (Tamil)
- Category: Second-level census division after regions
- Location: Singapore
- Created by: Urban Redevelopment Authority
- Created: September 1991 (proposed); 22 January 1999 (gazetted)
- Number: 55 (as of 2019)
- Populations: 20 (Lim Chu Kang) – 296,060 (Tampines)
- Areas: 0.83 km^{2} (0.32 sq mi) (Museum – smallest); 69.75 km^{2} (26.93 sq mi) (Western Water Catchment – largest)
- Government: National Government
- Subdivisions: Subzones (Level 3)

The planning areas of Singapore, also referred to as Development Guide Plan (DGP) areas, serve as the second level of urban planning and census divisions in Singapore as defined by the Urban Redevelopment Authority (URA). These areas provide a framework for urban development, land use planning and statistical analysis across the country. There are currently 55 planning areas, grouped into five regions: Central, East, North, North-East and West. Each planning area helps coordinate local development while contributing to the overall structure of its respective region. Each planning area is further subdivided into hundreds of subzones for more detailed planning purposes on the lowest level. A DGP is prepared for each planning area, providing detailed land use and development guidelines down to the individual plot level.

Planning areas were introduced in the early 1990s following the release of the 1991 Concept Plan, which marked a shift toward a long-term and strategic urban development. Since their implementation, planning area boundaries have been adopted by various government agencies for administrative and statistical purposes. For instance, the Department of Statistics of the Ministry of Trade and Industry (MTI) first used planning areas in its reporting of the 2000 census, replacing earlier divisions based on electoral boundaries. The Singapore Police Force (SPF) similarly aligned its Neighbourhood Police Centres (NPCs) jurisdictions with planning areas in 1999, moving away from the electoral division-based boundaries of the former Neighbourhood Police Posts (NPPs) system.

There are 6 planning areas in the East Region, 7 in the North-East Region, 8 in the North Region, 12 in the West Region and 22 in the Central Region. Tampines is the most populous planning area at 296,060 residents, whilst Lim Chu Kang and Paya Lebar are the least populous, with 20 residents each. Seven planning areas have no residents: the Central Water Catchment, Changi Bay, Marina East, Marina South, Simpang, Straits View, and the Western Islands. Museum is the smallest planning area at 0.83 square kilometres (0.32 sq mi), whilst the Western Water Catchment is the largest at 69.75 square kilometres (26.93 sq mi).

== List of planning areas ==
Planning areas are further subdivided into 332 subzones for statistical purposes. As of 2026, the total area of Singapore's planning areas sums to 784.9 km^{2} (303.1 sq mi), which is larger than the country's official land area of 744.3 km^{2} (287.4 sq mi). This variation occurs because the two government agencies use different geographic criteria to measure the country. The Department of Statistics calculates the official land area by measuring only physical land above the high water mark. However, the Urban Redevelopment Authority draws planning boundaries to include inland water bodies, such as reservoirs and rivers, within their administrative zones.

Reference map of the planning areas of Singapore (Note: Map as of 2021, showing land reclamation up to this point)

English • Malay (Note: Most place names are attested to be of Malay origin and referred to similarly in the Malay language. Every Malay name different from the corresponding English name is indicated after a bullet point.)	Chinese	Tamil	Region	Area (km^{2})	Population (2026)	Population density (/km^{2})	Subzones
Ang Mo Kio	宏茂桥	ஆங் மோ கியோ	North-East	13.94	159,330	11,428	12
Bedok	勿洛	பிடோக்	East	21.73	272,120	12,520	8
Bishan	碧山	பீஷான்	Central	7.61	87,810	11,542	3
Boon Lay	文礼	பூன் லே	West	8.28	30	4	4
Bukit Batok	武吉巴督	புக்கிட் பாத்தோக்	West	11.14	165,680	14,872	9
Bukit Merah	红山	புக்கிட் மேரா	Central	14.46	144,690	10,005	17
Bukit Panjang	武吉班让	புக்கிட் பாஞ்சாங்	West	9.02	135,110	14,979	7
Bukit Timah	武吉知马	புக்கிட் திமா	Central	17.51	86,720	4,951	8
Central Water Catchment • Kawasan Tadahan Air Tengah	中央集水区	மத்திய நீர் நீர்ப்பிடிப்பு	North	37.16	–	–	N/A
Changi	樟宜	சாங்கி	East	41.47	1,950	47	3
Changi Bay • Teluk Changi	樟宜湾	சாங்கி பே	East	1.97	–	–	N/A
Choa Chu Kang	蔡厝港	சுவா சூ காங்	West	6.12	185,520	30,327	6
Clementi	金文泰	கிளிமெண்டி	West	9.52	104,350	10,960	9
Downtown Core • Pusat Bandar	市中心	சிங்கப்பூர் நகர மையத்தில்	Central	5.08	6,230	1,226	13
Geylang	芽笼	கேலாங்	Central	9.64	121,350	12,582	5
Hougang	后港	ஹவ்காங்	North-East	13.93	226,100	16,228	10
Jurong East • Jurong Timur	裕廊东	ஜூரோங் கிழக்கு	West	17.86	72,160	4,040	11
Jurong West • Jurong Barat	裕廊西	ஜூரோங் மேற்கு	West	14.68	250,890	17,090	9
Kallang	加冷	காலாங்	Central	8.58	102,550	11,946	9
Lim Chu Kang	林厝港	லிம் சூ காங்	North	17.50	20	1	N/A
Mandai	万礼	மண்டாய்	North	11.77	2,030	173	3
Marina East • Marina Timur	滨海东	மெரினா கிழக்கு	Central	1.84	–	–	N/A
Marina South • Marina Selatan	滨海南	மெரினா தென்	Central	1.63	–	–	N/A
Marine Parade	马林百列	மரின் பரேட்	Central	6.13	48,490	7,906	5
Museum • Muzium	博物馆	அருங்காட்சியகம்	Central	0.83	860	1,037	3
Newton	纽顿	நியூட்டன்	Central	2.07	10,390	5,022	6
North-Eastern Islands • Kepulauan Timur Laut	东北群岛	வடகிழக்கு தீவுகள்	North-East	67.25	30	0	N/A
Novena	诺维娜	நொவீனா	Central	8.97	53,930	6,014	5
Orchard	乌节	ஆர்ச்சர்ட்	Central	0.96	1,550	1,619	3
Outram	欧南	ஊட்ரம்	Central	1.37	17,010	12,387	4
Pasir Ris	巴西立	பாசிர் ரிஸ்	East	15.80	145,050	9,179	8
Paya Lebar	巴耶利峇	பாய லேபார்	East	11.69	20	2	5
Pioneer	先驱	பயனியர்	West	12.22	50	4	5
Punggol	榜鹅	பொங்கோல்	North-East	9.37	204,490	21,814	7
Queenstown	女皇镇	குவீன்ஸ்டவுன்	Central	21.68	101,970	4,703	15
River Valley	里峇峇利	நதி பள்ளத்தாக்கு	Central	1.48	13,350	9,047	5
Rochor	梧槽	ரோச்சோர்	Central	1.59	12,640	7,957	10
Seletar	实里达	சிலேத்தார்	North-East	10.85	300	28	4
Sembawang	三巴旺	செம்பவாங்	North	12.64	115,270	9,122	9
Sengkang	盛港	செங்காங்	North-East	10.60	265,830	25,071	7
Serangoon	实龙岗	சிராங்கூன்	North-East	10.10	115,860	11,471	7
Simpang	新邦	சிம்பாங்	North	8.28	–	–	4
Singapore River • Sungai Singapura	新加坡河	சிங்கப்பூர் நதி	Central	0.96	4,770	4,981	3
Southern Islands • Kepulauan Selatan	南部群岛	தெற்கு தீவுகள்	Central	7.13	2,840	399	2
Straits View • Pemandangan Selat	海峡景	ஸ்ட்ரெய்ட்ஸ் காண்க	Central	1.13	–	–	N/A
Sungei Kadut • Sungai Kadut	双溪加株	சுங்கை காடுட்	North	17.59	700	40	5
Tampines	淡滨尼	தெம்பினிஸ்	East	20.80	296,060	14,237	5
Tanglin	东陵	டங்லின்	Central	7.55	25,190	3,335	4
Tengah	登加	தெங்கா	West	7.36	34,340	4,664	6
Toa Payoh	大巴窑	தோ பாயோ	Central	8.18	148,940	18,207	12
Tuas	大士	துவாஸ்	West	47.70	80	2	6
Western Islands • Kepulauan Barat	西部群岛	மேற்கத்திய தீவுகள்	West	45.81	–	–	3
Western Water Catchment • Kawasan Tadahan Air Barat	西部集水区	மேற்கத்திய நீர் நீர்ப்பிடிப்பு	West	69.75	590	8	3
Woodlands	兀兰	ஊட்லண்ட்ஸ்	North	13.61	255,280	18,753	9
Yishun	义顺	யீஷூன்	North	21.01	231,030	10,996	9

== See also ==
- Administrative divisions of Singapore
  - Constituencies of Singapore
- Urban planning in Singapore
  - Regions of Singapore
- Urban renewal in Singapore
  - Future developments in Singapore
  - Land reclamation in Singapore
- Geography of Singapore
