= List of stadiums in Singapore =

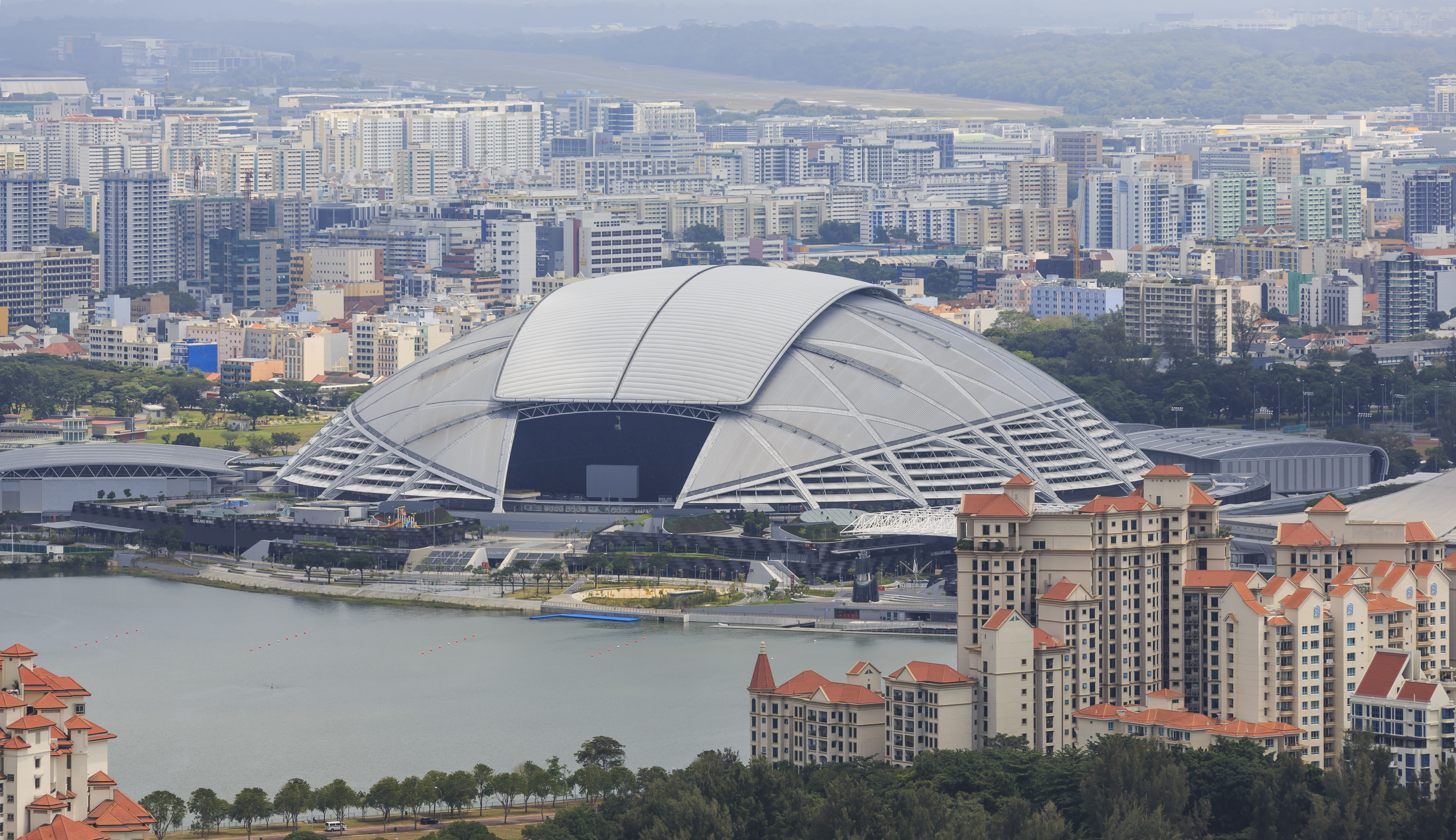
The National Stadium in Kallang

The following is a list of stadiums in Singapore.

== Public stadiums ==
These stadiums are run by the Sport Singapore.

Stadium	Capacity	City	Opened
National Stadium	55,000	Kallang	2014
Singapore Indoor Stadium	12,000	Kallang	1985
Bishan Stadium	6,000	Bishan	1998
Jalan Besar Stadium	6,000	Kallang	1932
Our Tampines Hub	5,000	Tampines	2017
Woodlands Stadium	4,300	Woodlands	1989
Choa Chu Kang Stadium	4,268	Choa Chu Kang	2001
Jurong West Stadium	4,200	Jurong West	2006
Clementi Stadium	4,000	Clementi	1983
Toa Payoh Stadium	3,890	Toa Payoh	1974
Queenstown Stadium	3,800	Queenstown	1970
Bedok Stadium	3,800	Bedok	1982
Hougang Stadium	3,800	Hougang	1998
Yishun Stadium	3,400	Yishun	1992
Bukit Gombak Stadium	3,000	Bukit Batok	1990s
Jurong East Stadium	2,700	Jurong East	1998
Yio Chu Kang Stadium	2,000	Ang Mo Kio	1985
Serangoon Stadium	1,200	Serangoon	1993

Note: Most or All of the Stadiums are used for the Singapore Premier League and its various divisions.

=== Demolished stadiums ===
Stadium	Capacity	City	Opened	Demolished
Anson Road Stadium	10,000	Tanjong Pagar	1924	1945
Former National Stadium	55,000	Kallang	1973	2011
Jurong Stadium	8,000	Jurong West	1973	2020
Marina Bay Floating Platform	27,000	Marina Bay	2007	2024
Old Tampines Stadium	5,000	Tampines	1989	2013

=== Future Stadiums ===
Stadium	Capacity	City	Opening
NS Square	30,000	Marina Bay	2027
Punggol Stadium	5,000	Punggol	2026
Toa Payoh Stadium	10,000	Toa Payoh	2030

These stadiums are managed by government or government-aided schools. Some may be used by the public either by booking through the SSC or on a "Free to Play" sharing basis where walk-ins without bookings are permitted.

Stadium	City	Public usage	Track	Ref.
Anderson Junior College Sports Field	Ang Mo Kio	No	Yes	
Anglo-Chinese Junior College Sports Field	Queenstown	No	Yes	
Catholic Junior College Sports Field	Novena	No	Yes	
Dunman High School Sports Field	Kallang	No	Yes	
Innova Junior College Sports Field	Woodlands	No	Yes	
Jurong Junior College Sports Field	Jurong West	Yes (only during opening hours)	Yes	
Kallang Ground	Kallang	No	Yes	
National Junior College Sports Field	Bukit Timah	No	Yes	
Meridian Junior College Sports Field	Pasir Ris	Yes (Bookable)	Yes	
Millennia Institute Sports Field	Bukit Batok	No	Yes	
Montfort Secondary School Sports Field	Hougang	No	No	
Nanyang Junior College Sports Field	Serangoon	No	Yes	
Paya Lebar Methodist Girls' School Sports Field	Hougang	No	Yes	
Jurong Pioneer Junior College Sports Field	Choa Chu Kang	No	Yes	
Singapore Cricket Club Ground	Choa Chu Kang	No	Yes	
Saint Andrew's Junior College Stadium	Toa Payoh	No	Yes	
Serangoon Junior College Sports Field	Hougang	No	Yes	
Tampines Junior College Sports Field	Tampines	No	Yes	
Temasek Junior College Sports Field	Bedok	No	Yes	
Victoria Junior College Sports Field	Marine Parade	No	Yes	
Yishun Junior College Sports Field	Yishun	No	Yes	

These stadiums are managed by government ministries.

Stadium	City	Agency	Public usage	Track	Ref.
Bedok Camp Stadium	Bedok	Ministry of Defence	No	Yes	
Bedok Reform Training Centre Stadium	Tampines	Ministry of Home Affairs	No	Yes	
Changi Naval Base Stadium	Changi East	Ministry of Defence	No	Yes	
Stagmont Camp Field	Choa Chu Kang	Ministry of Defence	No	No	
Home Team Academy Sports Stadium	Western Water Catchment	Ministry of Home Affairs	No	Yes	
Keat Hong Camp Stadium	Western Water Catchment	Ministry of Defence	No	Yes	
Khatib Camp Stadium	Yishun	Ministry of Defence	No	Yes	
Kranji Camp Stadium	Western Water Catchment	Ministry of Defence	No	Yes	
Ladang Camp Stadium	North-Eastern Islands	Ministry of Defence	No	Yes	
Mandai Hill Camp Stadium	Sungei Kadut	Ministry of Defence	No	Yes	
Mount Vernon Camp Stadium	Toa Payoh	Ministry of Home Affairs	No	Yes	
Nee Soon Camp Stadium	Mandai	Ministry of Defence	No	Yes	
Old Police Academy Sports Field	Novena	Ministry of Home Affairs	No	Yes	
Pasir Ris Camp Stadium	Pasir Ris	Ministry of Defence	No	Yes	
Pasir Laba Camp Field	Western Water Catchment	Ministry of Defence	No	No	
SAFTI Military Institute Stadium	Jurong West	Ministry of Defence	No	Yes	
Sungei Gedong Camp Field	Western Water Catchment	Ministry of Defence	No	Yes	
Tuas Naval Base Stadium	Tuas	Ministry of Defence	No	Yes	

== Private stadiums ==
Stadium	City	Track	Ref.
Anglo-Chinese School (Independent) Sports Field	Queenstown	Yes	
Australian International School Sports Field	Serangoon	No	
French School of Singapore Stadium	Serangoon	Yes	
Hwa Chong Institution Sports Field	Bukit Timah	Yes	
NUS High School of Mathematics and Science Sports Field	Clementi	Yes	
Raffles Institution Sports Field	Bishan	Yes	
Singapore American School Stadium	Woodlands	Yes	

- ITE College Central Stadium
- ITE College East Stadium
- ITE College West Stadium
- Nanyang Polytechnic Stadium
- Nanyang Technological University Stadium
- National University of Singapore Stadium
- Ngee Ann Polytechnic Stadium
- Republic Polytechnic Stadium
- Singapore Polytechnic Stadium
- Singapore Sports School Stadium
- Singapore University of Technology and Design Stadium
- Temasek Polytechnic Stadium
