= NS Square =

Future venue in Marina Bay, Singapore

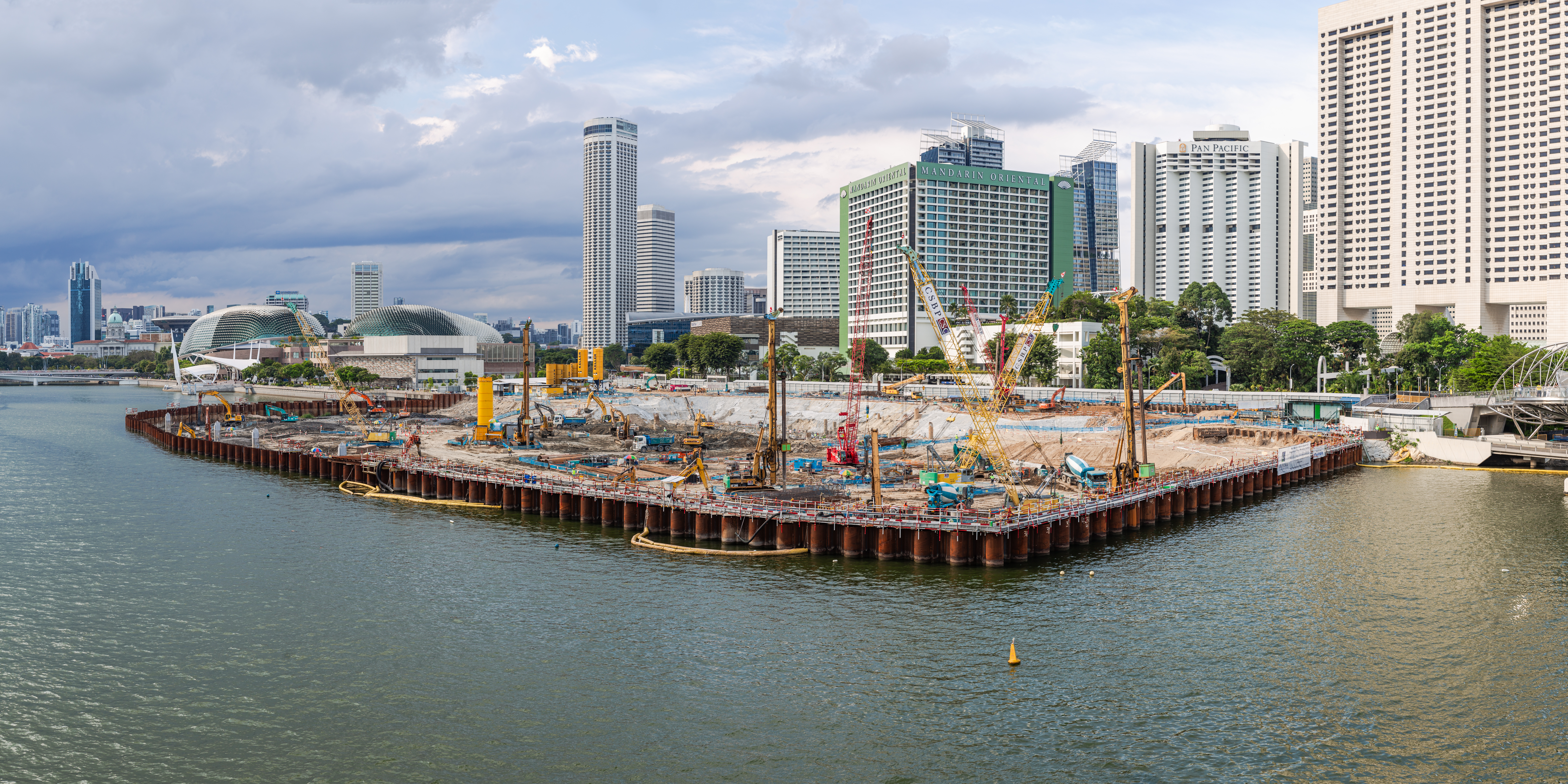
- Construction of NS Square in December 2024
- Interactive map of NS Square
- Address: 20 Raffles Avenue, Singapore 039805
- Location: Marina Bay, Central Region, Singapore
- Coordinates: 1°17′18″N 103°51′32″E
- Capacity: 30,000
- Public transit: CC4 DT15 Promenade

NS Square is a future outdoor multi-purpose venue in the Downtown Core area of Marina Bay, Singapore, designed by local architectural firm WOHA, in collaboration with design firm, Populous. NS Square will occupy the former site of The Float@Marina Bay. It was first conceptualised in January 2020 to be a permanent replacement of the existing temporary floating platform. Construction of NS Square has started in March 2024, with completion expected in 2027. Along with a 30,000-seat grandstand, NS Square will house a National Service themed gallery, community sports facilities and a public waterfront promenade. The venue will also be able to host football matches.

== See also ==
- Padang, Singapore, historic place for the events of national importance in Singapore
- Farrer Park Field, another historic place for the events of national importance in Singapore
- Singapore National Day parade
