= Padang, Singapore =

Playing field in Singapore

The Padang
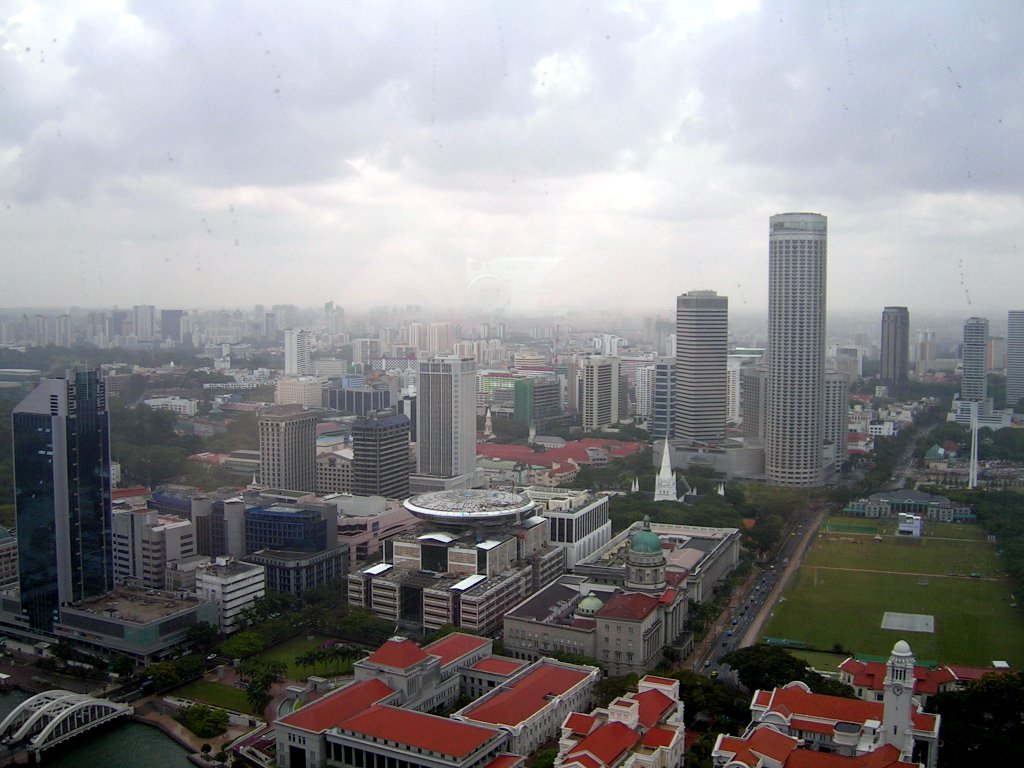
- An aerial view of Singapore, showing the Padang on the right, surrounded by Parliament House building, new and old Supreme Court Buildings and Swissôtel The Stamford.

- Location within Singapore
- 1°17′26″N 103°51′11″E
- Type: playing field
- Location: Connaught Drive, Singapore 179861

Site notes
- Governing body: National Heritage Board

National monument of Singapore
- Designated: 9 August 2022; 4 years ago
- Reference no.: 75

The Padang (Malay for 'field'), formerly known as The Plain and The Esplanade, is an open playing field located within the Downtown Core of the Central Area in Singapore. It includes the Padang Cricket Ground.

== Background ==
The Padang is surrounded by several important landmarks, which include Saint Andrew's Cathedral, City Hall, the Old Supreme Court Building and the City Hall MRT station.

From the 1830s to the early 20th century, the Padang was known as the Esplanade.

== History ==
As the only open plain in the area, the Padang was chosen by William Farquhar as the location of the British encampment in Singapore on 28 January 1819.

The Padang was used as a public recreational space since at least the 1830s. For most of its existence, it was used as pitch for cricket, football and rugby matches. In 1852, the Singapore Cricket Club was formed and a clubhouse built on the western edge of the Padang. In 1884, the Singapore Recreation Club erected its clubhouse on the opposite end of the green.

In 1887, to commemorate the Golden Jubilee of Queen Victoria, a bronze statue of Sir Stamford Raffles was erected in the centre of the Padang. It was later removed in 1919 by the Municipal Council to outside Victoria Memorial Hall, where it currently stands.

During the Second World War, the Japanese used the Padang as a gathering point for European and Eurasians before they were marched to internment camps on the island. Subhas Chandra Bose's Indian National Army held their parades there in June 1945.

Due to its prime location and historical significance, it has been used as a venue for a variety of events. It was the first host of the Singapore National Day parade (NDP), and has hosted it on a regular cycle (every three years from 1984 to 1994, every five years since) and during years that mark national milestones (such as the bicentennial of modern Singapore in 2019). From 2023 through 2027, it will host the parade due to the reconstruction of its designated main venue The Float @ Marina Bay as NS Square. Except for 2026, where the parade held at National Stadium.

On 4 November 2018, the Padang hosted the live finals of the Mandopop reality music competition SPOP Sing!.

On 3 August 2019, Deputy Prime Minister Heng Swee Keat announced that the Padang will be gazetted as a National Monument along with the Anderson Bridge, Cavenagh Bridge and the Elgin Bridge (collectively known as the Singapore River Bridges), due to the historical significance - these include the World War II surrender in 1945, National Day Parade and the signing of the country's formation in the British colony and self-independence. The Preservation of Monuments (Amendment) Act will allow open spaces or the whole of the area to be gazetted as national monuments, such as Fort Siloso and Padang.

On 8 August 2022, it was announced that the Padang would be gazetted as the nation's 75th national monument on 9 August, the 57th anniversary of the Republic's independence.

== Gallery ==
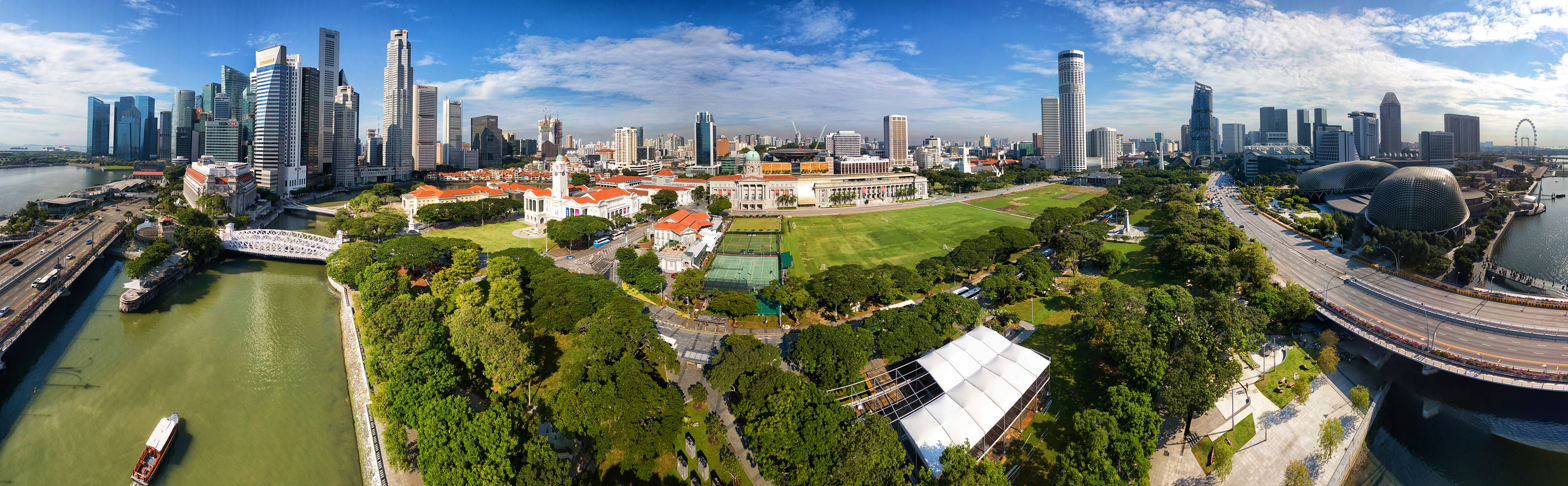
Aerial panorama of Singapore's Downtown Core

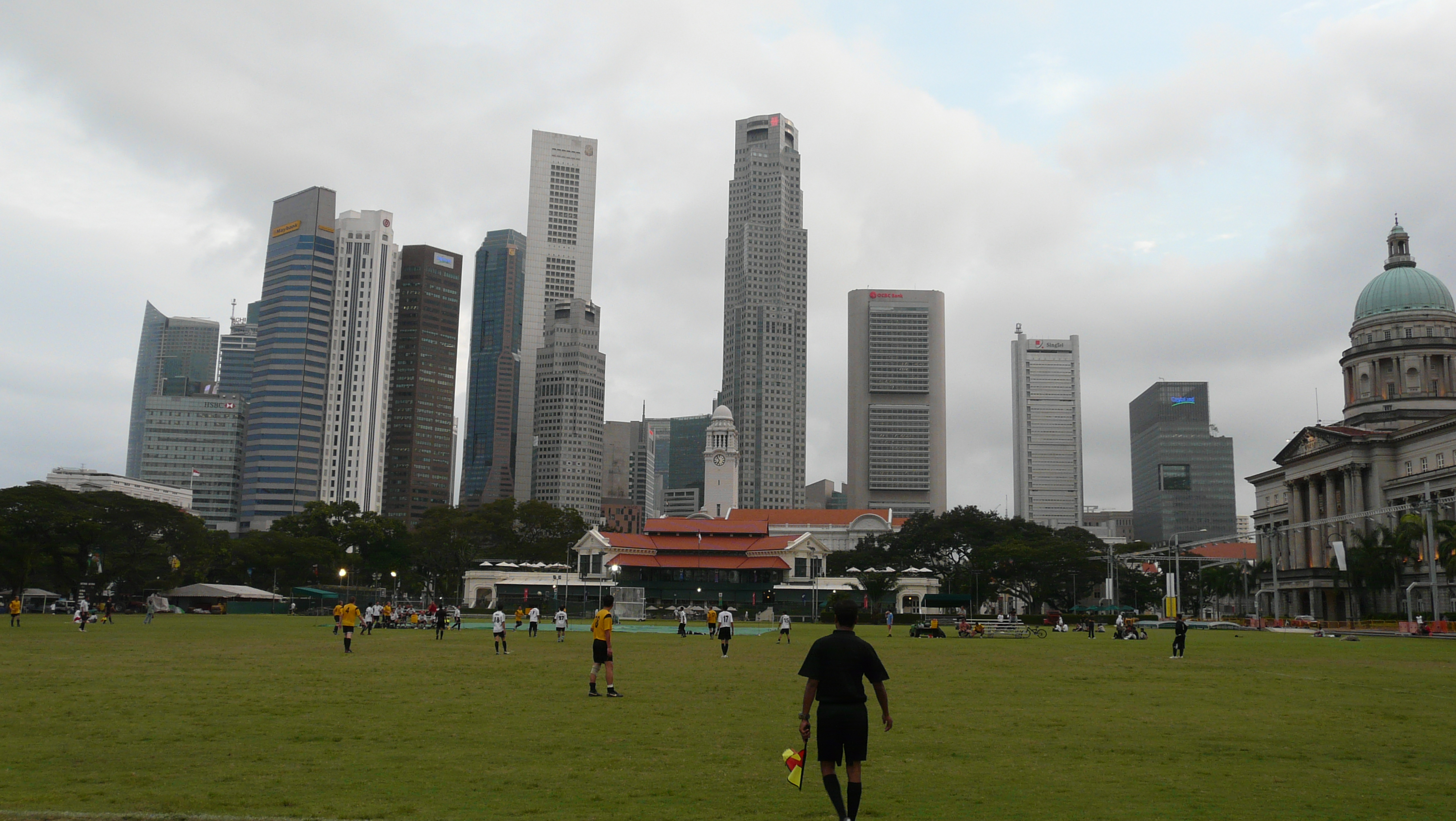
A football match at the Padang set against the Singapore skyline.

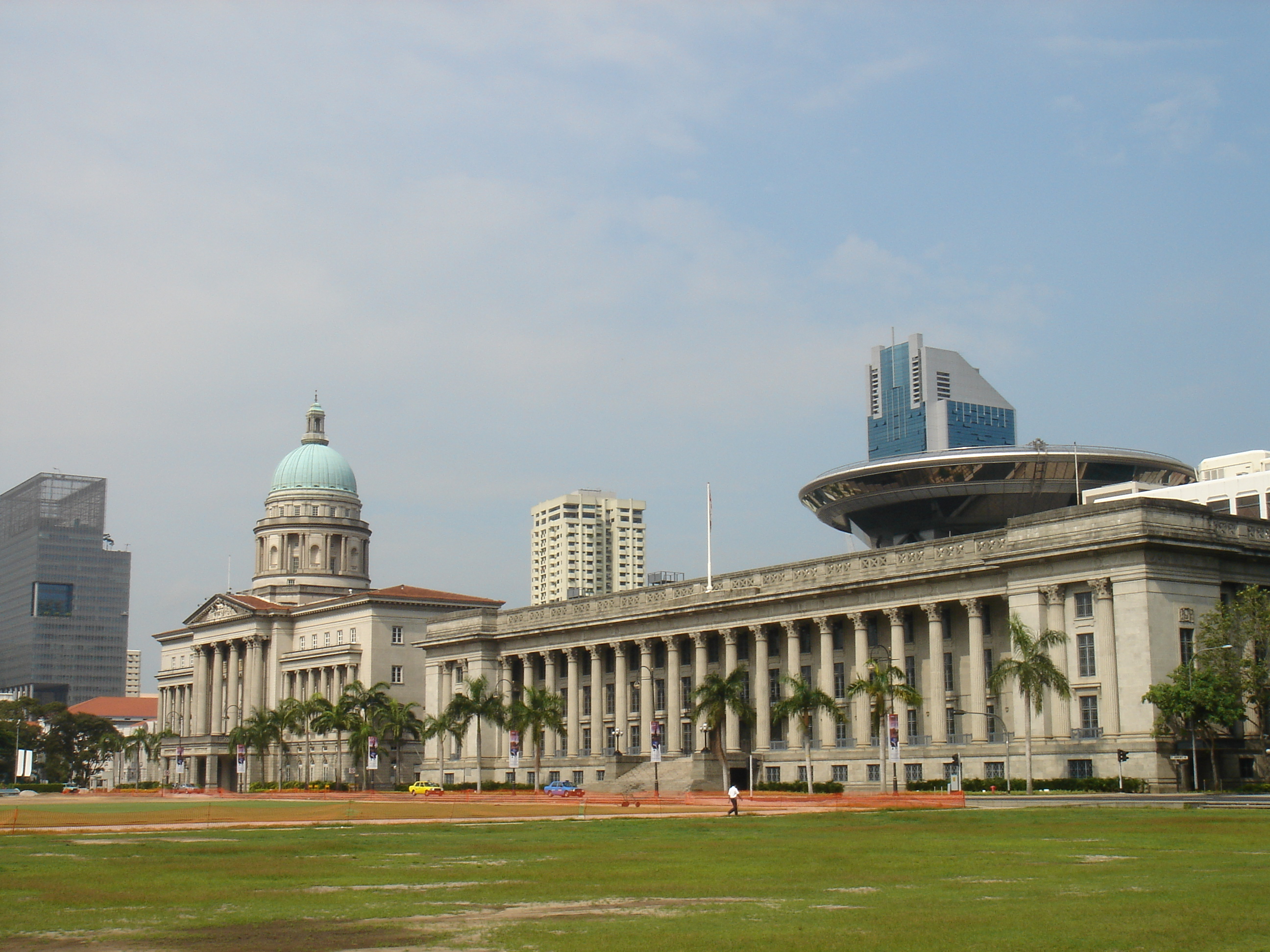
Old Supreme Court Building with the Padang, the New Supreme Court Building shown in the background.

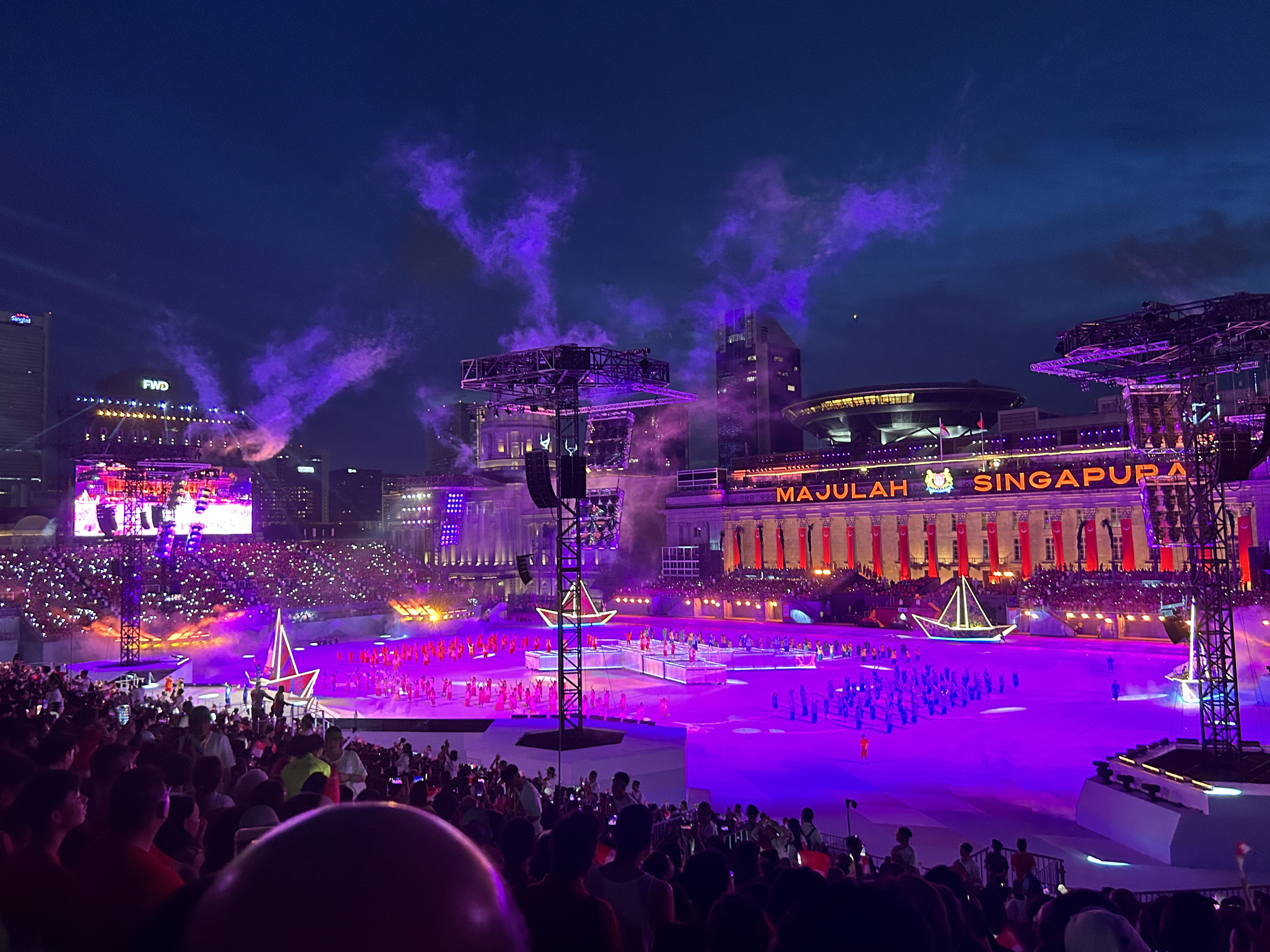
Singapore's National Day Parade (NDP) 2023 at the Padang.

== See also ==
- INA at Padang
