= Youth Olympic Park =

Park in Singapore

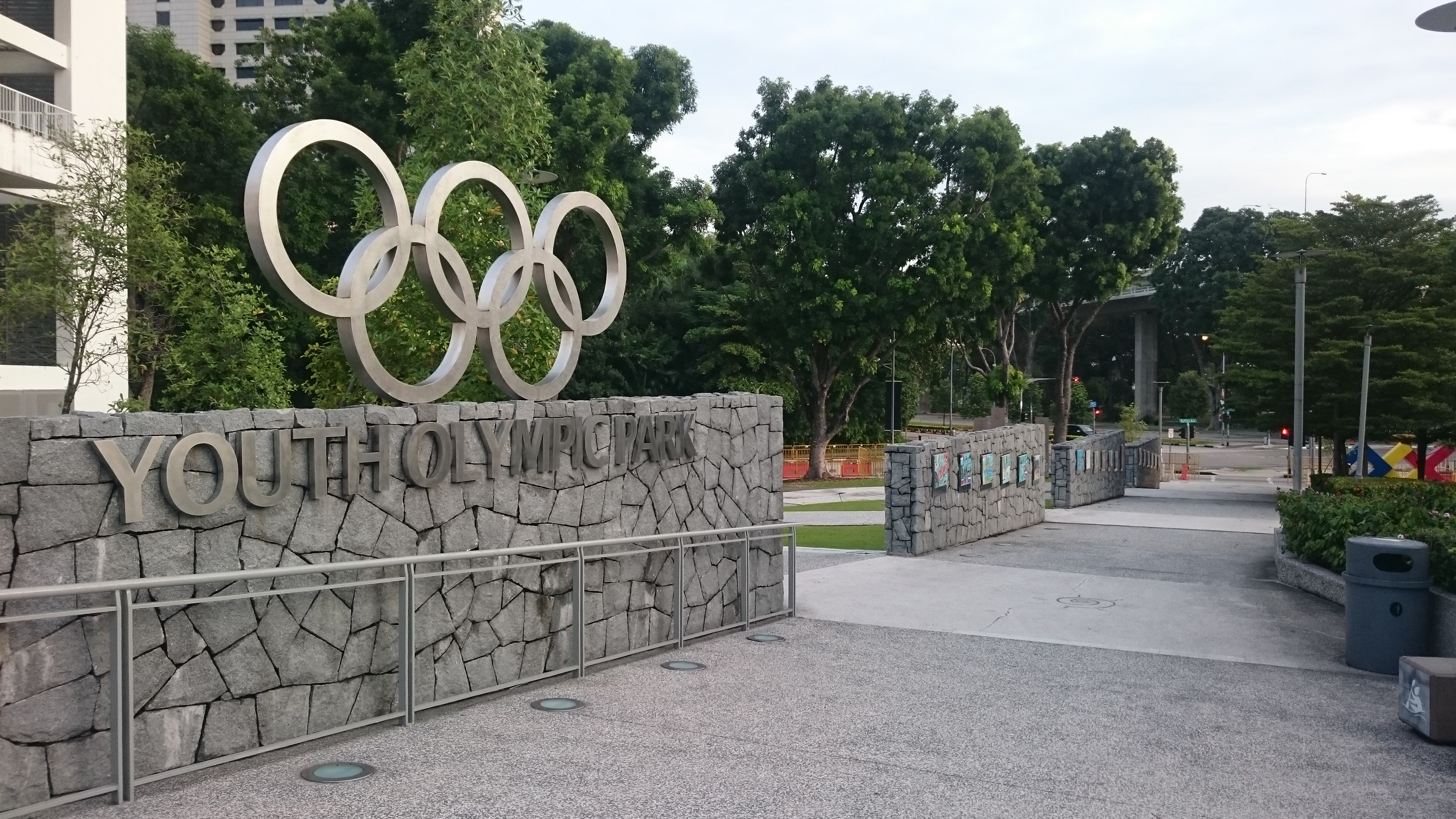
- The sidewalk of the Youth Olympic Park with its numerous art installations in 2010

- Location within Singapore
- Type: Urban park
- Location: Raffles Avenue, Singapore
- Coordinates: 1.2890°N 103.8604°E
- Area: 0.4 hectares (4,000 m^{2})
- Opened: 24 April 2010; 16 years ago
- Manager: National Parks Board
- Status: Open
- Public transit: DT15 CC4 Promenade

Youth Olympic Park is Singapore's first art park. It is located at Raffles Avenue, at the junction of Raffles Avenue and Bayfront Bridge in Marina Bay. Artworks displayed at the site have included A World United.

== Getting there ==
- Nearest MRT station - Promenade MRT station

== See also ==
- List of parks in Singapore
- National Parks Board
