= Marina Bay, Singapore =

Bay in the Central Area of Singapore

Marina Bay

Name transcription(s)
  - Chinese: 滨海湾 (Simplified) 濱海灣 (Traditional); Bīnhǎiwān (Pinyin)
  - Malay: Teluk Marina
  - Tamil: மரீனா பே / மரீனா விரிகுடா Marīṉā Pē / Marīṉā Virikuṭā (Transliteration)
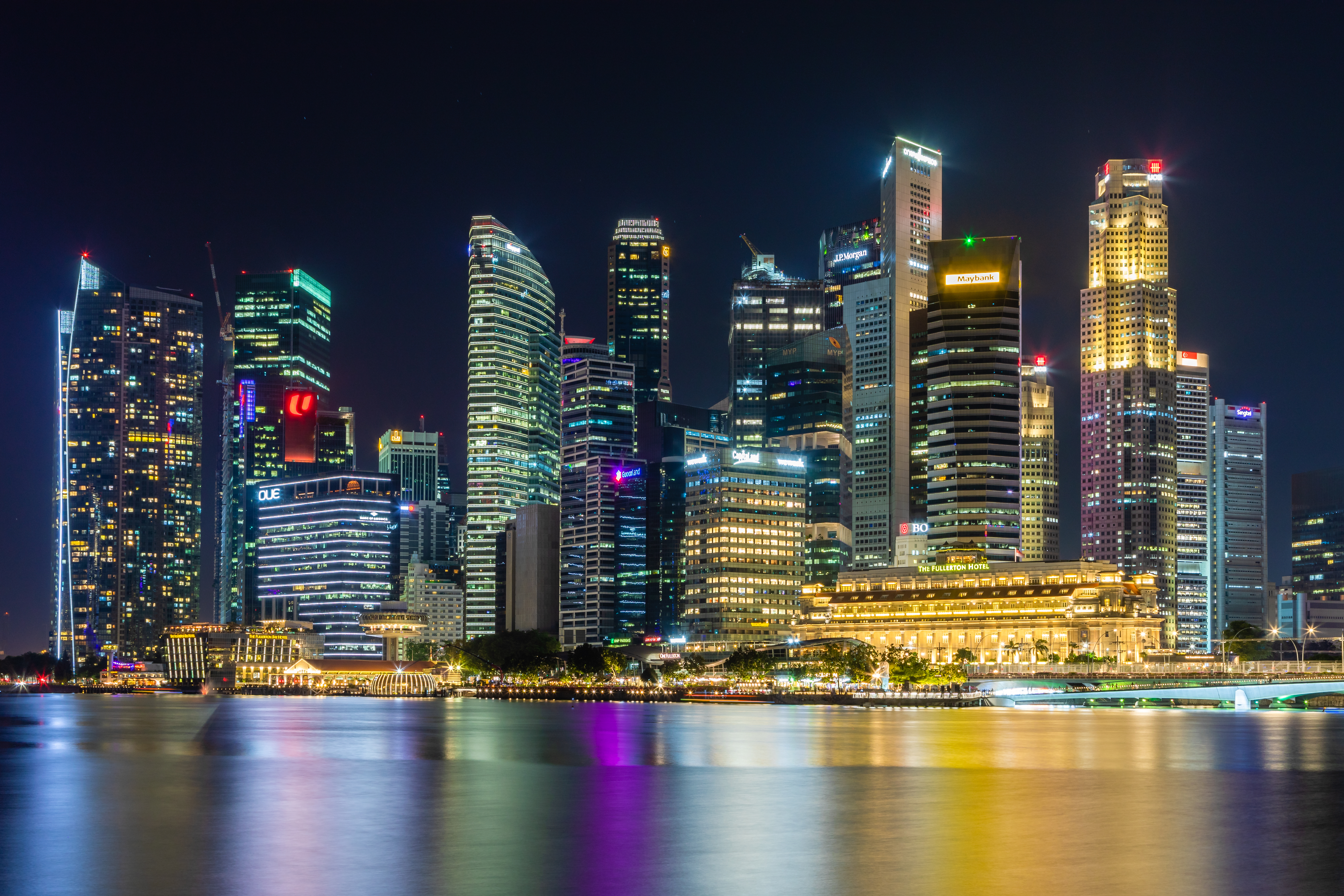
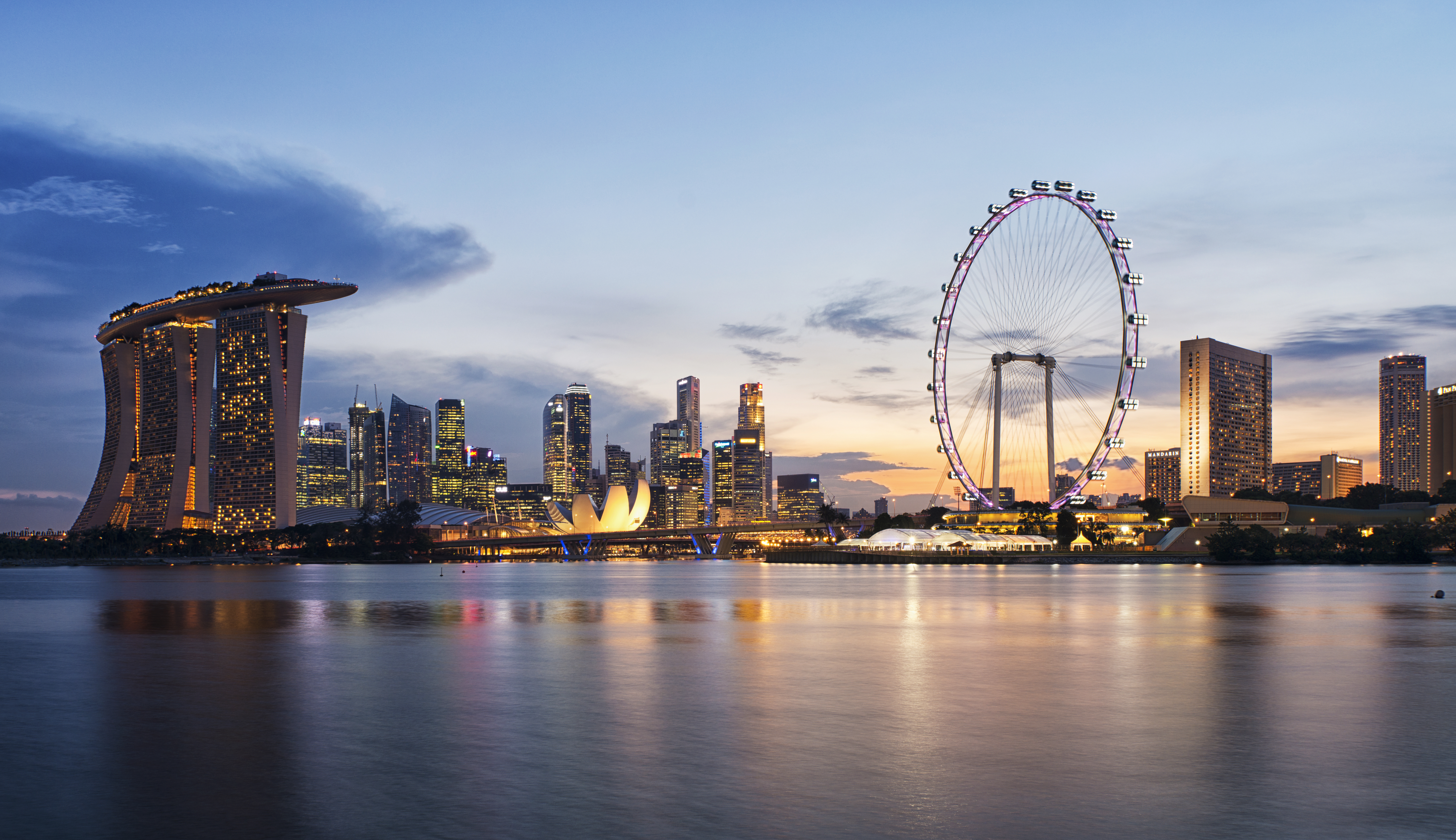
- Skyline of Singapore's Downtown Core in Marina Bay at night, Marina Bay at sunset

- Location of Marina Bay within Singapore
- Coordinates: 1°17′04″N 103°51′21″E
- Country: Singapore

Government
  - Members of Parliament: Jalan Besar GRC: Denise Phua; Josephine Teo

Marina Bay is a bay located in the Central Area of Singapore, surrounded by the perimeter of four other planning areas, the Downtown Core, Marina East, Marina South and Straits View. The area surrounding the bay itself, also called Marina Bay, is a 360 hectare extension to the adjacent Central Business District. It is also the new downtown of Singapore, built on Singapore's reclaimed land.

Buildings include Gardens by the Bay, the Marina Bay Sands, Marina Bay Financial Centre, Asia Square, The Sail @ Marina Bay and Marina One integrated mixed-use developments. It is one of the key focus areas by the Urban Redevelopment Authority. Marina Bay is envisioned by the URA as a work-live-play vibrant 24-hour CBD.

== Geography ==
The Marina Bay is a freshwater bay at the confluence of four rivers: the Singapore River, Kallang River, Geylang River, and Rochor River.

== Master Plan ==
The Urban Redevelopment Authority (URA) Master Plan for Marina Bay aims to encourage a mix of uses for this area, including commercial, residential, hotel and entertainment.

== History ==
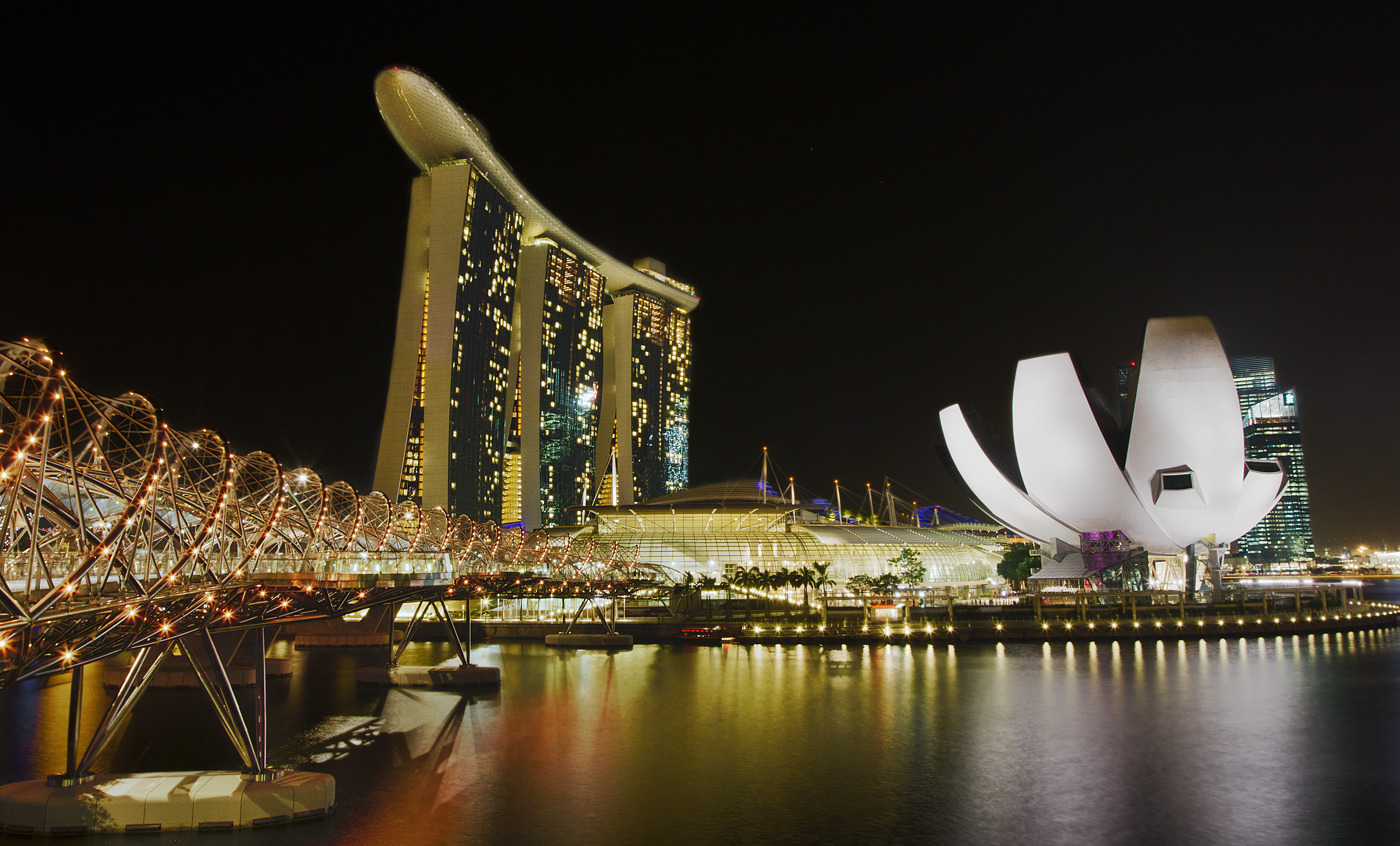
Marina Bay at night

In 1954, land reclamation work to create 360 hectares of prime waterfront site began at Marina Bay. The reclaimed land forms what is today the Marina Centre and Marina South areas, and the reclamation work was completed in 1992. In the reclamation process, Inner/Outer Basins (anchorage area for commercial and naval vessels), Telok Ayer Basin (now site of Asia Square Tower 1 and 2) and Inner Roads was removed from the map by reclaiming land, while the Singapore River's mouth now flows into the bay instead of directly into the sea.

The long term visions for the Marina Bay area were first articulated in the 1983 Master Plan by the Urban Redevelopment Authority (URA), with the waterfront areas being deliberately kept open to the public. In 1988, the draft plan for Marina Bay was presented to the public in a two-week exhibition where it set out the objectives for the development, among which are optimising the waterfront location and creating a distinctive image with international landmarks that could become a focal point for the city.

The URA Master Plan for Marina Bay aims to encourage a mix of uses for this area, including commercial, residential, hotel and entertainment and to turn it into a work-live-play vibrant 24-hour CBD. In 2005, the Urban Redevelopment Authority spent $400,000 on a branding exercise to name the Marina Bay area in order to sell the new major developments in the area, only to settle with the original name "Marina Bay".

The Singapore government also spent $35 million to complete the 3.5 km Waterfront Promenade around Marina Bay. It includes a new eco-friendly visitor centre and the Helix Bridge linking Bayfront to Marina Centre where the Youth Olympic Park is located. The Promontory @ Marina Bay (formerly Central Promontory Site) will be used as an interim event and public space used for activities such as theatres and carnivals.

In 2008, Marina Barrage was built, converting the basin into a freshwater Marina Reservoir.

== Events at Marina Bay ==
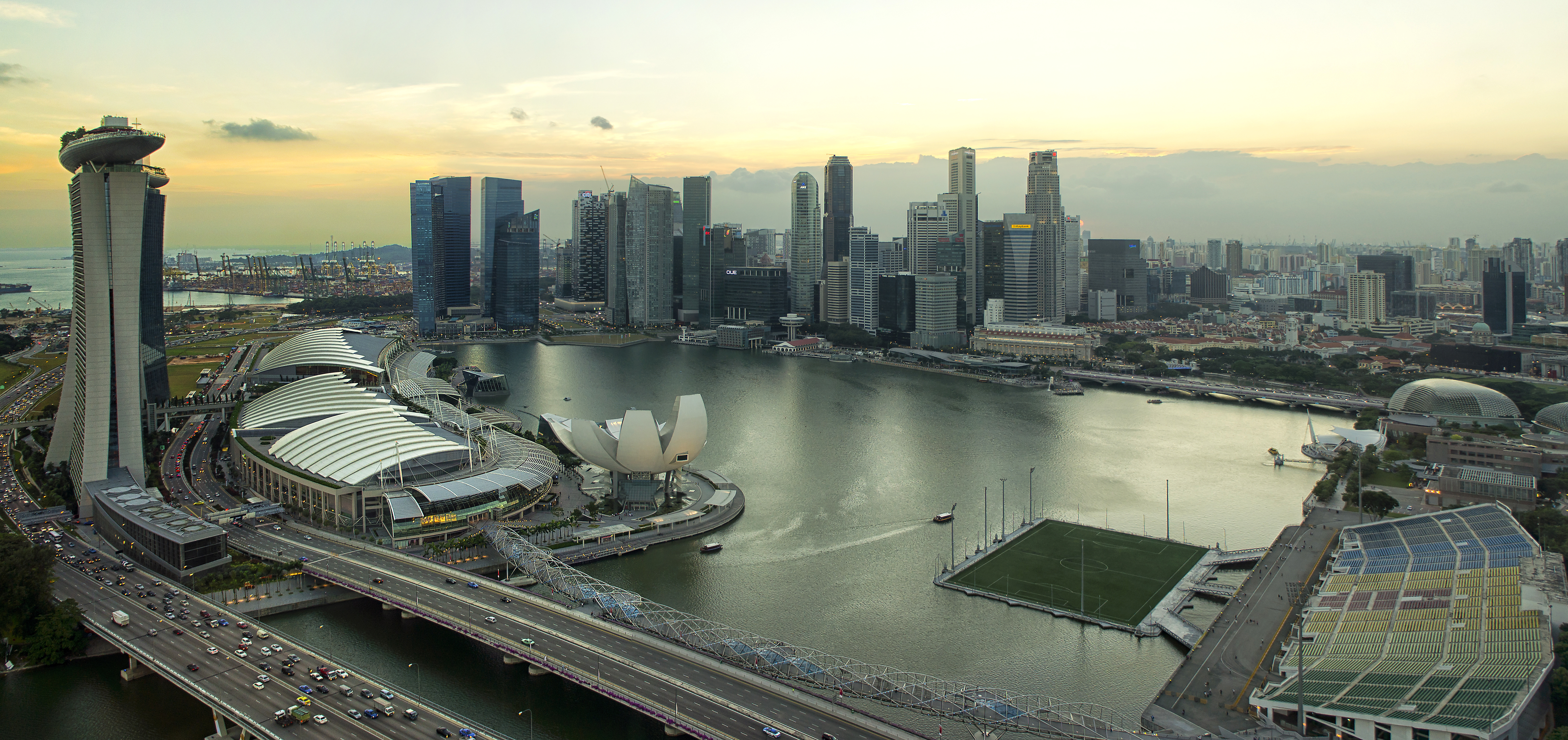
Marina Bay viewed from the Singapore Flyer at sunset

The Formula One Singapore Grand Prix has taken place annually since 2008 (with the exception of the 2020 and 2021 seasons) on a street circuit adjacent to Marina Bay. Since its construction in 2007, The Float@Marina Bay has hosted events such as the National Day Parade, New Year's Eve Countdown and Singapore Fireworks Celebrations, and also serves as a spectator stand for the Singapore Grand Prix. Furthermore, it also played host to the opening and closing ceremonies of the inaugural 2010 Summer Youth Olympics.

The area also hosts the annual i Light Marina Bay, a sustainable light art festival.

The event space next to Marina Bay Sands, known as The Lawn, hosted the first overseas and Singapore edition of ArtBox Bangkok on two separate weekends, 14–16 April and 21–23 April 2017.

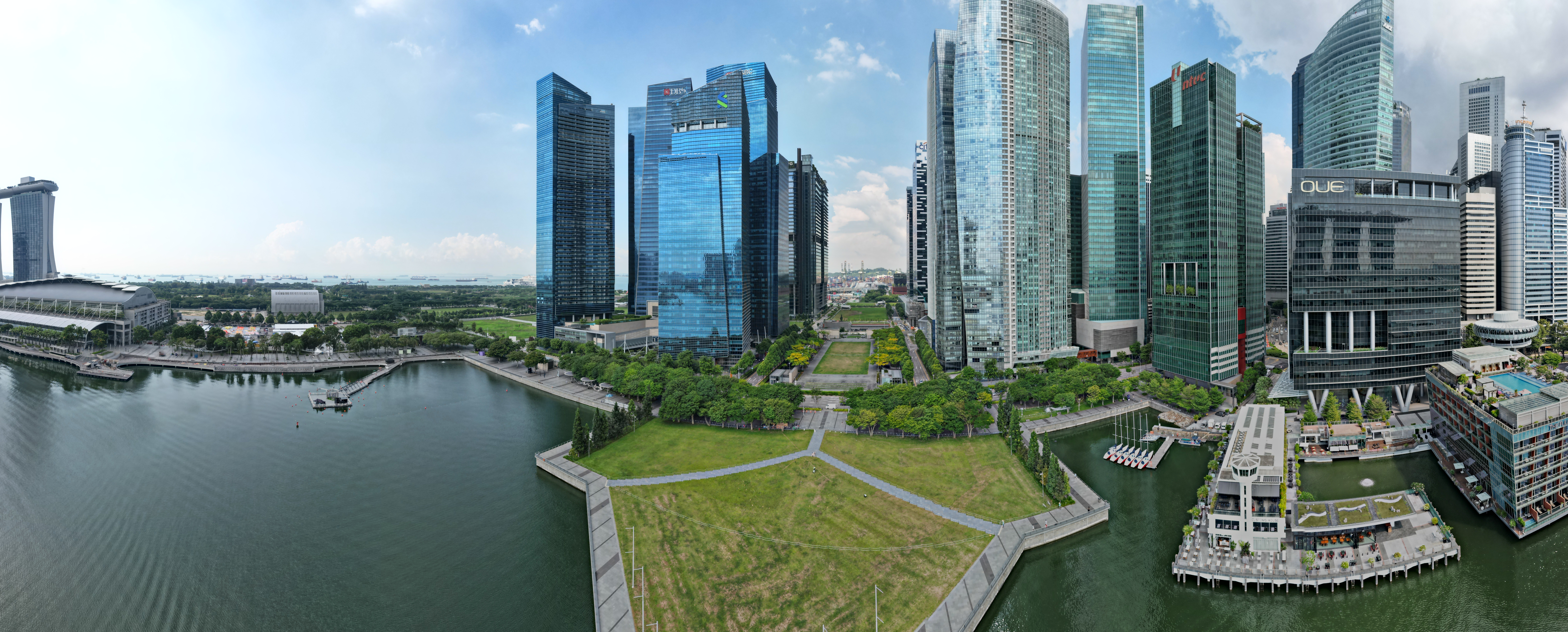
Marina Promontory 300522

== Infrastructure ==
The Singapore government pumped nearly S$2 billion (about US$1.2 billion) to build the infrastructural base for Marina Bay, which includes the Marina Barrage, increased connectivity to the MRT, and the new Marina Promenade and Helix Bridge.

=== Common Services Tunnel ===
The Common Services Tunnel is a development of the Marina Bay area in Singapore. It is said to be the second of its kind in Asia after Japan. This utility tunnel houses telecom cables, power lines, water pipes as well as provision for pneumatic refuse collection pipes. The 1.4-kilometre (4,600 ft) phase one of the tunnel has cost about S$81 million (about US$51 million) while 1.6-kilometre (5,200 ft) phase two, cost around S$137 million (about US$86 million).

=== District cooling ===
SP Group's subsidiary, Singapore District Cooling, started operating Singapore's first district cooling plant, supplying chilled water supplies to One Raffles Quay in May 2006. A second district cooling plant was commissioned in May 2010, which will supply chilled water for the air-conditioning of buildings in the area through pipes housed within the Common Services Tunnel, according to the report. Built at a cost of some S$110 million (about US$69 million), the second district cooling plant will be able to serve 1.25 million square metres of gross floor area and free up space which should be used for building chiller plants and cooling towers for separate buildings. The second district cooling plant started operations on 3 March 2016.

=== Water management ===
In 2004, the Public Utilities Board announced plans to construct a new downtown reservoir by damming the Marina Channel. This barrage was completed in 2008. Known as the Marina Barrage, it turned Marina Bay and the Kallang Basin into a confined freshwater reservoir with limited access to marine transportation to regulate the water quality. The new reservoir provides another source of drinking water for Singapore, as well as a stable water level for a variety of water activities and events. The barrage also prevents flooding in the Chinatown area.

=== Transport ===
Marina Bay is served by five Mass Rapid Transit (MRT) lines—North–South Line (NSL), East–West Line (EWL), Circle Line (CCL), Downtown Line (DTL) and Thomson–East Coast Line (TEL)—and nine stations—City Hall, Raffles Place, Marina Bay, Bayfront, Downtown, Telok Ayer, Esplanade, Promenade, Shenton Way and Gardens by the Bay. A 2010 report predicted that Marina Bay would be served by three new lines by 2014—an extension of NSL to Marina South Pier, the CCL Extension and DTL—and another two lines by 2020—the Thomson Line and Eastern Region Line, later merging to form the TEL.

To cater to the ease of pedestrian movement, an extensive network of shaded or sheltered walkways, and underground and second-storey links were constructed. This provides a seamless connection between the developments in the district, including the MRT stations.

== Key developments ==
=== In Marina Bay ===
- ArtScience Museum
- Asia Square
- Bayfront Bridge
- Circle line
- Clifford Pier
- Common Services Tunnel
- Conrad Centennial Singapore
- Downtown line
- Esplanade – Theatres on the Bay
- F1 Pit Building
- Gardens by the Bay
- Marina Bay Street Circuit
- The Fullerton Heritage Precinct: Customs House, The Fullerton Hotel Singapore, The Fullerton Waterboat House, One Fullerton, Fullerton Bay Hotel
- The Helix Bridge
- Marina Barrage
- Marina Bay Cruise Centre Singapore
- Marina Bay Financial Centre
- Marina Bay Golf Course
- Marina Bay Link Mall
- Marina Bay MRT station
- Marina Bay Sands
- Marina Bay Suites
- Marina Coastal Expressway
- Marina South Pier
- Marina South Pier MRT station
- Marina Square
- Millenia Walk
- North South line
- One Marina Boulevard
- One Raffles Quay
- One Shenton Way
- OUE Bayfront
- Singapore Flyer
- Suntec City
- The Float @ Marina Bay
- The Lawn @ Marina Bay
- The Promontory @ Marina Bay (formerly Central Promontory Site)
- The Sail @ Marina Bay
- Thomson–East Coast line
- Youth Olympic Park

=== Other places of interest ===
- The 101-hectare Gardens by the Bay site is made up of Bay South Garden, Bay East Garden, and Bay Central Garden across the mouth of the Singapore River. All three gardens will be interconnected via a series of pedestrian bridges to form a larger loop along the whole waterfront and linked to surrounding developments, open public spaces, transport nodes and attractions.
- A 3.5 km waterfront promenade linking the attractions at the Marina Centre, Collyer Quay and Bayfront areas was completed in 2010.

== Gallery ==
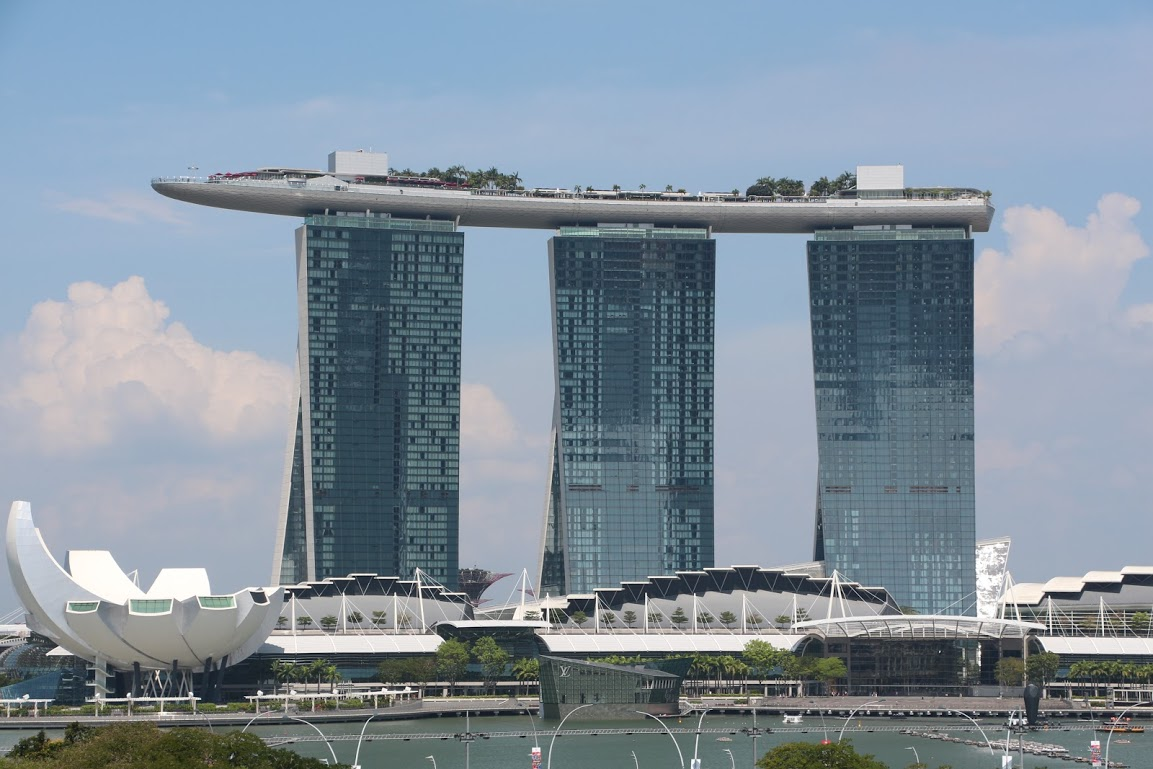
Marina Bay Sands

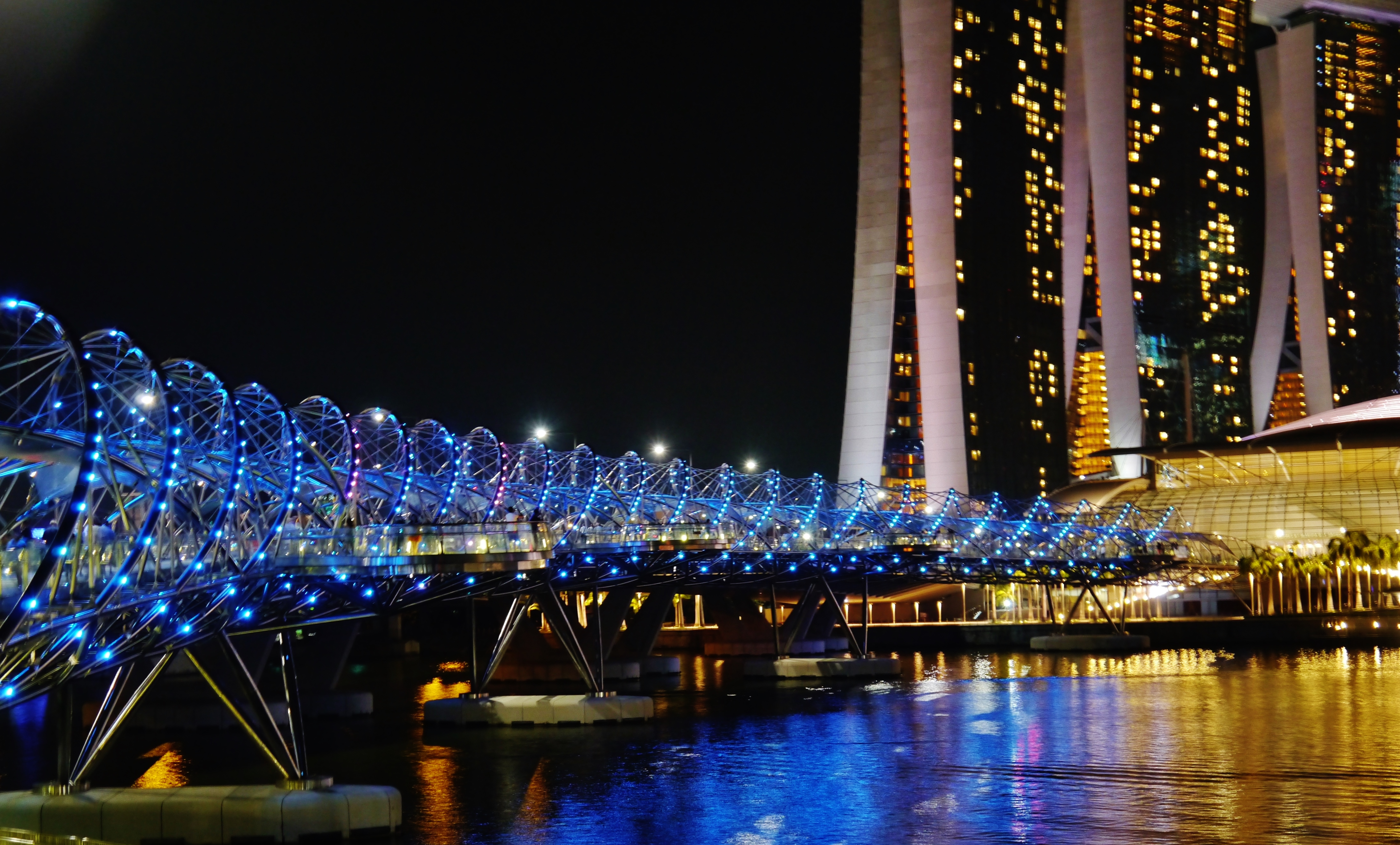
The Helix Bridge

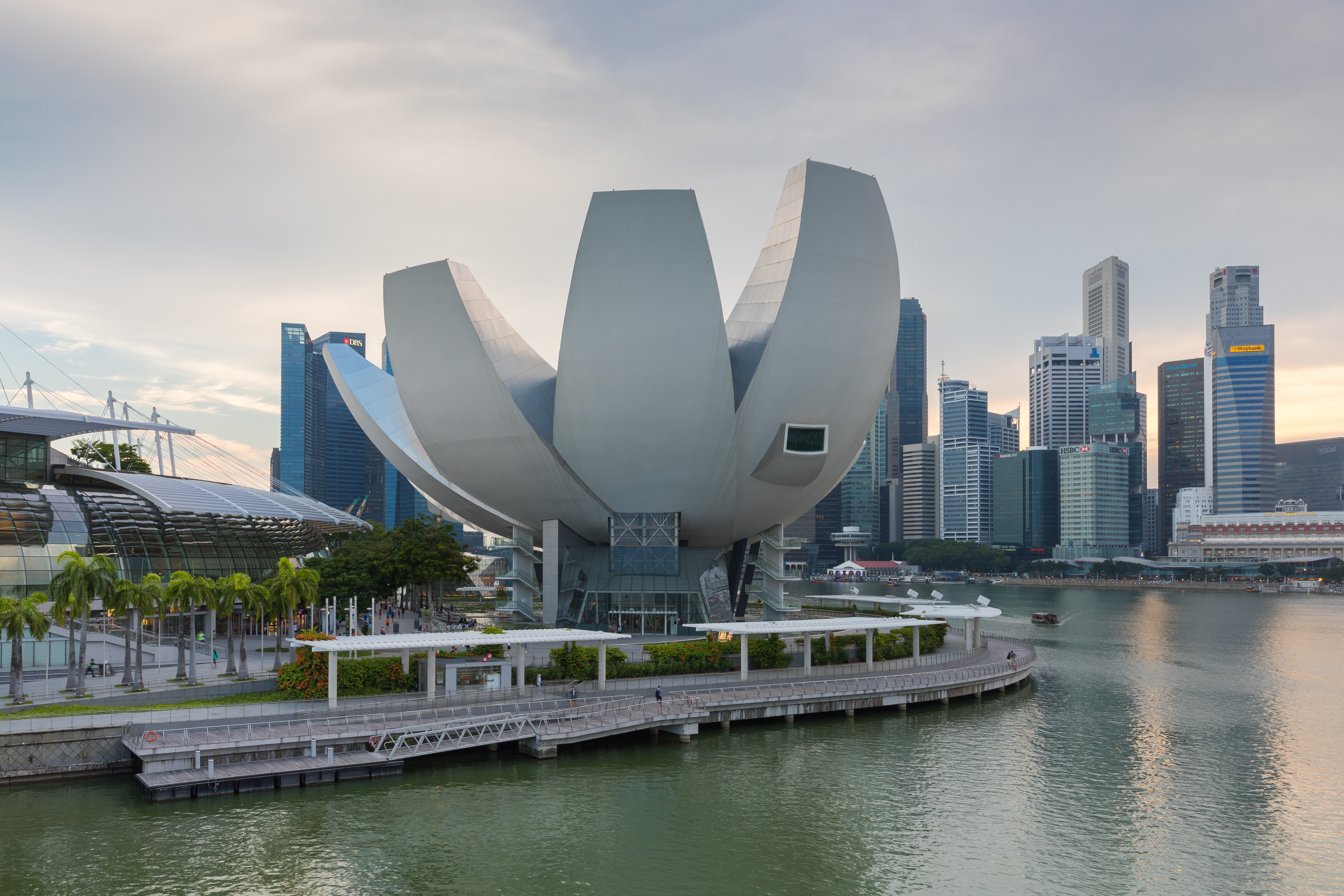
ArtScience Museum

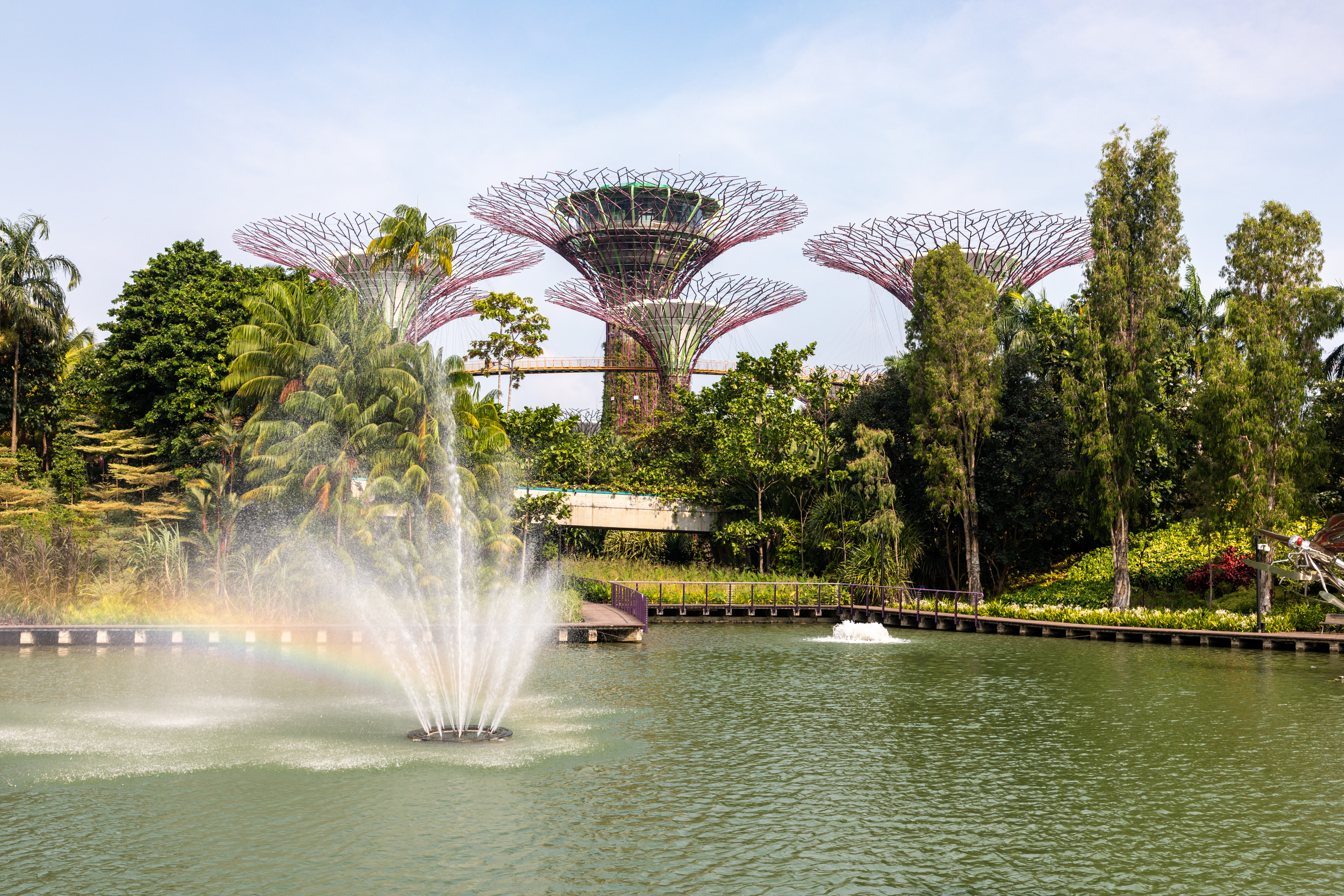
Gardens by the Bay

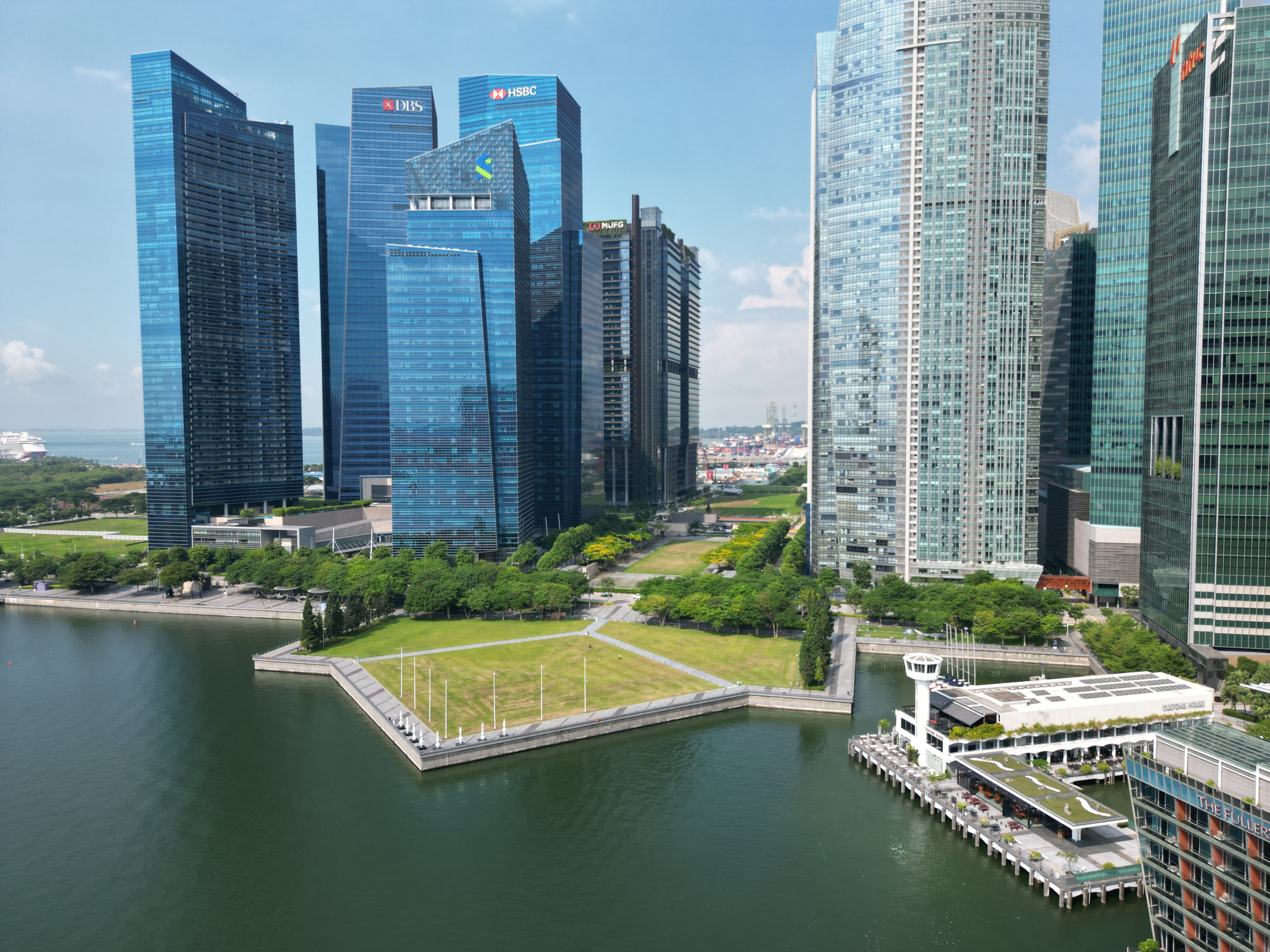
Marina Promontory

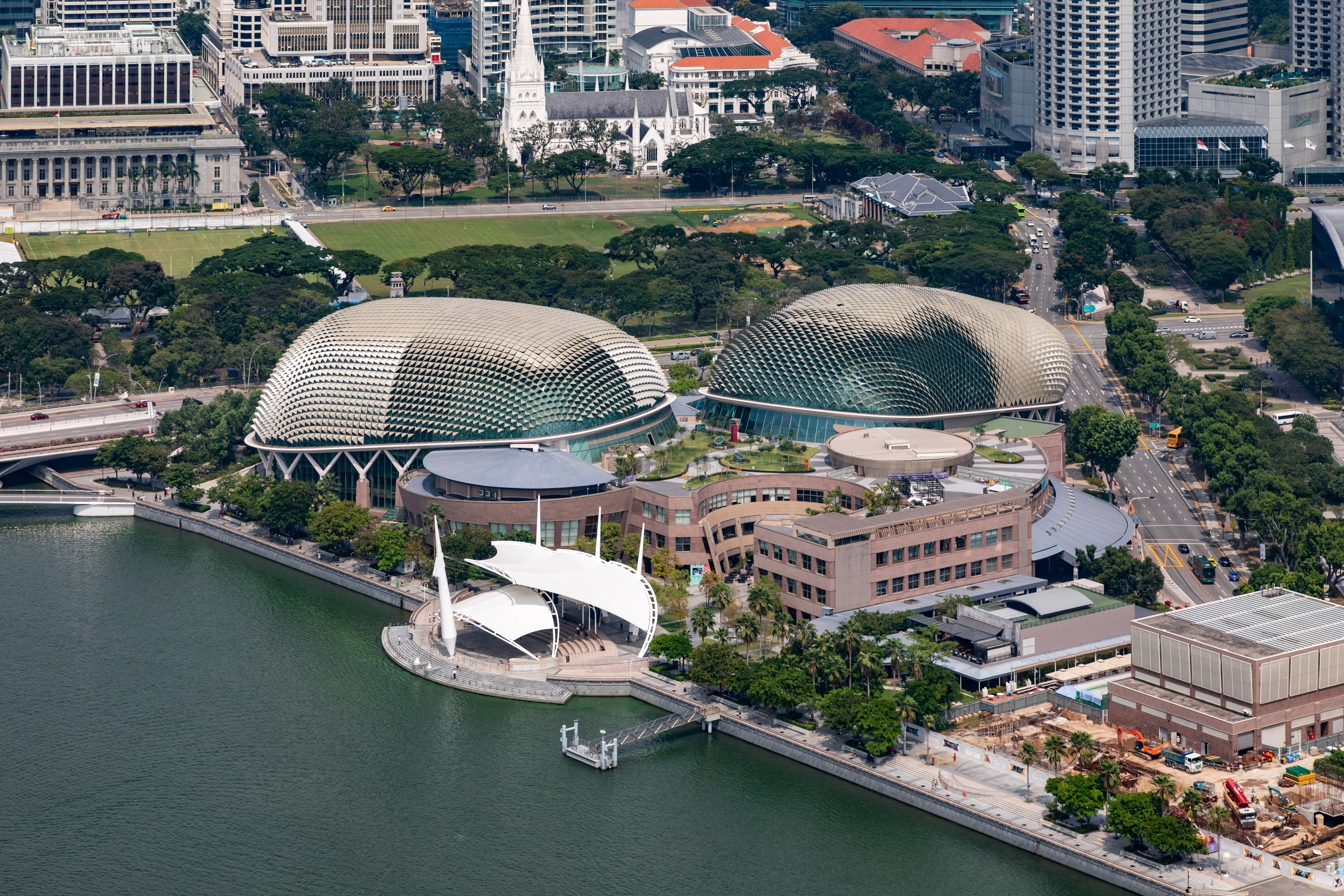
Esplanade – Theatres on the Bay

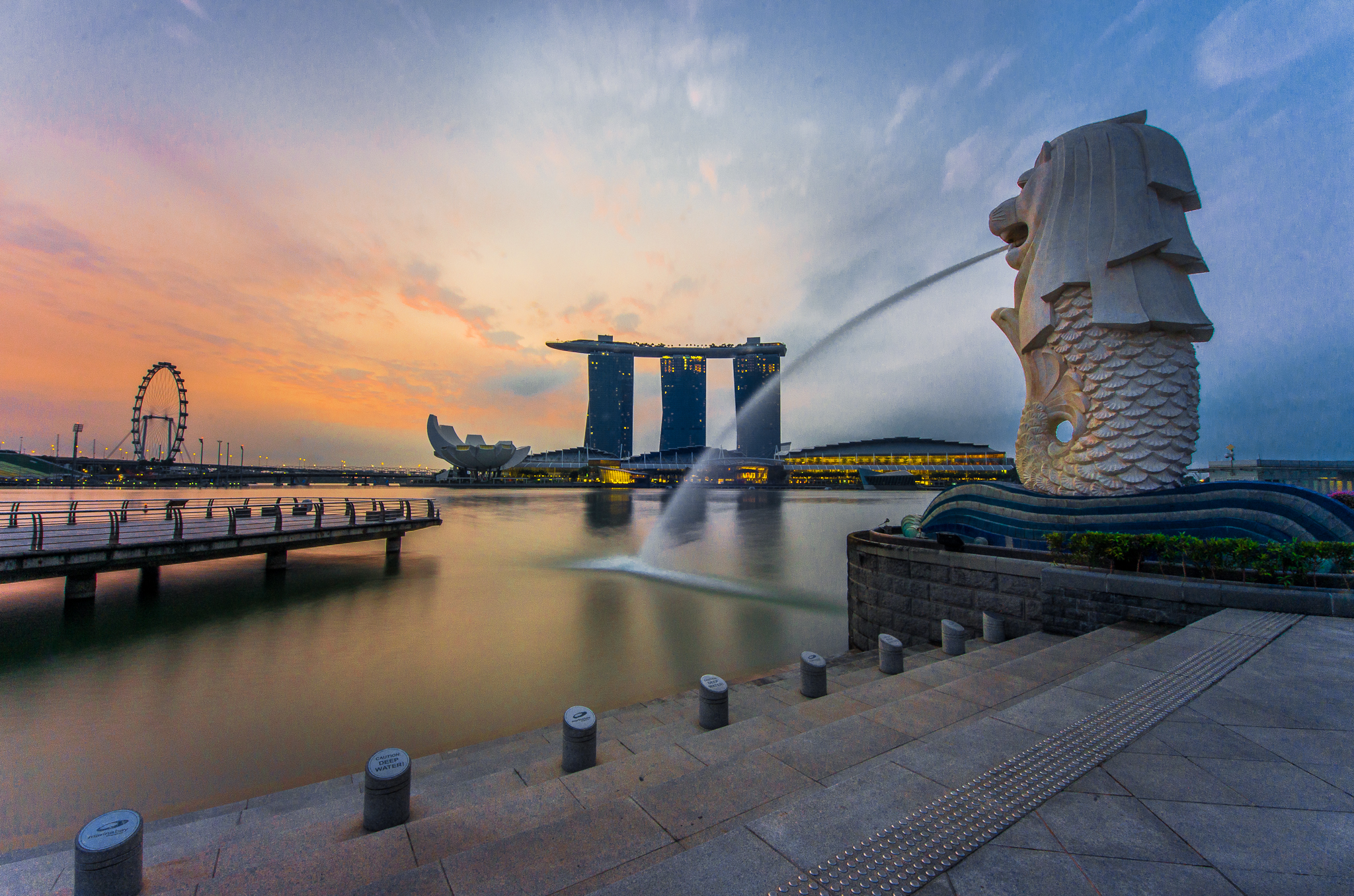
View of Marina Bay from the Merlion

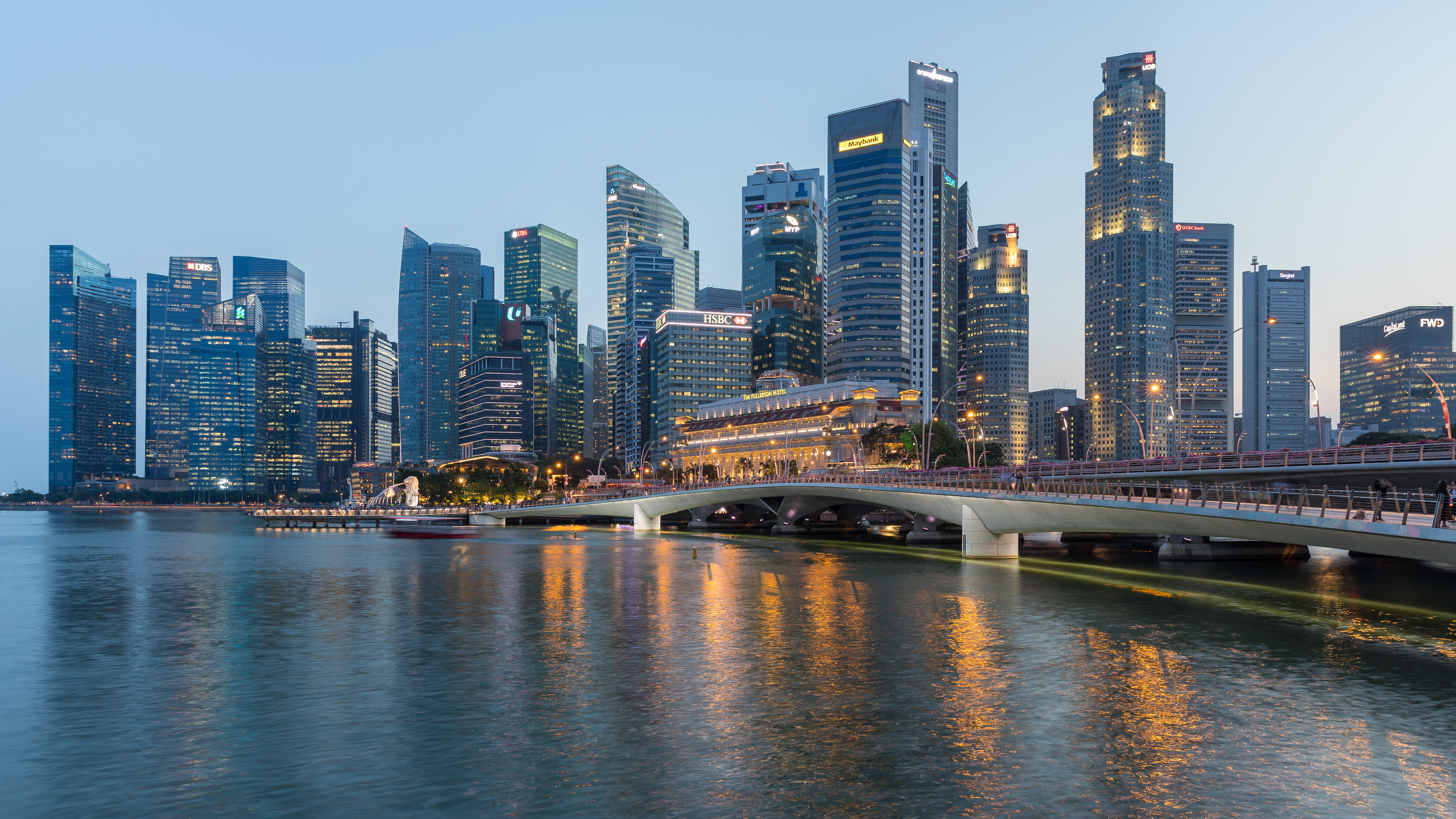
Esplanade Bridge

== See also ==
- Downtown Core
- Future developments in Singapore
- Marina Centre
- Marina South
