= Singapore Fireworks Celebrations =

Annual event held in Singapore

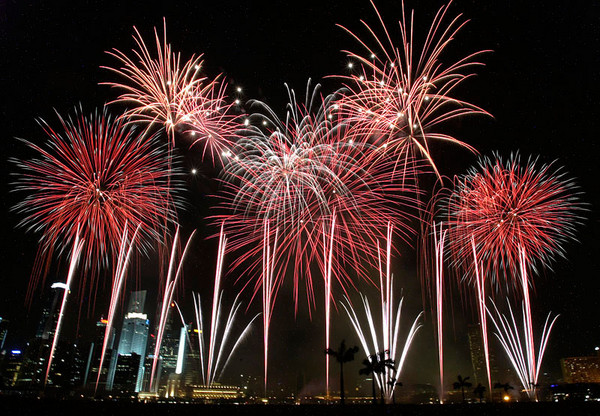
Singapore Fireworks Festival on 8 Aug 2006

The Singapore Fireworks Celebrations was an annual event held in Singapore as part of its National Day celebrations. It featured several local and foreign teams which launched fireworks displays on different nights.

== History ==
First held in 2004 at Marina Bay, the event was initially known as the Singapore Fireworks Festival and was organised by Unusual Productions.

In 2007, the festival was renamed Singapore Fireworks Celebrations and had a new organiser Festival Square Circle. The event cost over S$1 million, and featured 130 varieties of fireworks over two days. The event was supported by the Singapore Tourism Board.

The amount of fireworks used grew in magnitude from 4,000 rounds in 2004 to over 9,000 in 2006.

== List of performances and teams ==
2004 (Marina Bay)

- August 1, 2000 hours - United States
- August 8, 2030 hours - Singapore
- August 15, 2000 hours - Hong Kong

2005 (Marina Bay)

- August 6, 1940 hours - Portugal
- August 8, 2359 hours - Singapore
- August 14, 2000 hours - France

2006 (Marina Bay)

- August 5, 2100 hours - Italy (Dynamic City)
- August 8, 2100 hours - Singapore (Our City of Colours)
- August 11, 2100 hours - New Caledonia (Nature & Mystique / Truly Malanesian)
- August 12, 2100 hours - France (Celebration of Life)

2007 (Marina Bay): The World Celebrates with Singapore

- August 17, 2100 hours - Pirotecnia Igual, Spain
- August 18, 2100 hours - Lidu Fireworks Corporation, China

2008 (Marina Bay): The World Celebrates with Us

- August 22, 2100 hours - Féérie, France (French Romance)
- August 23, 2100 hours- South Korea (Korean Fantasia)
