= Havelock Road =

Road in Singapore

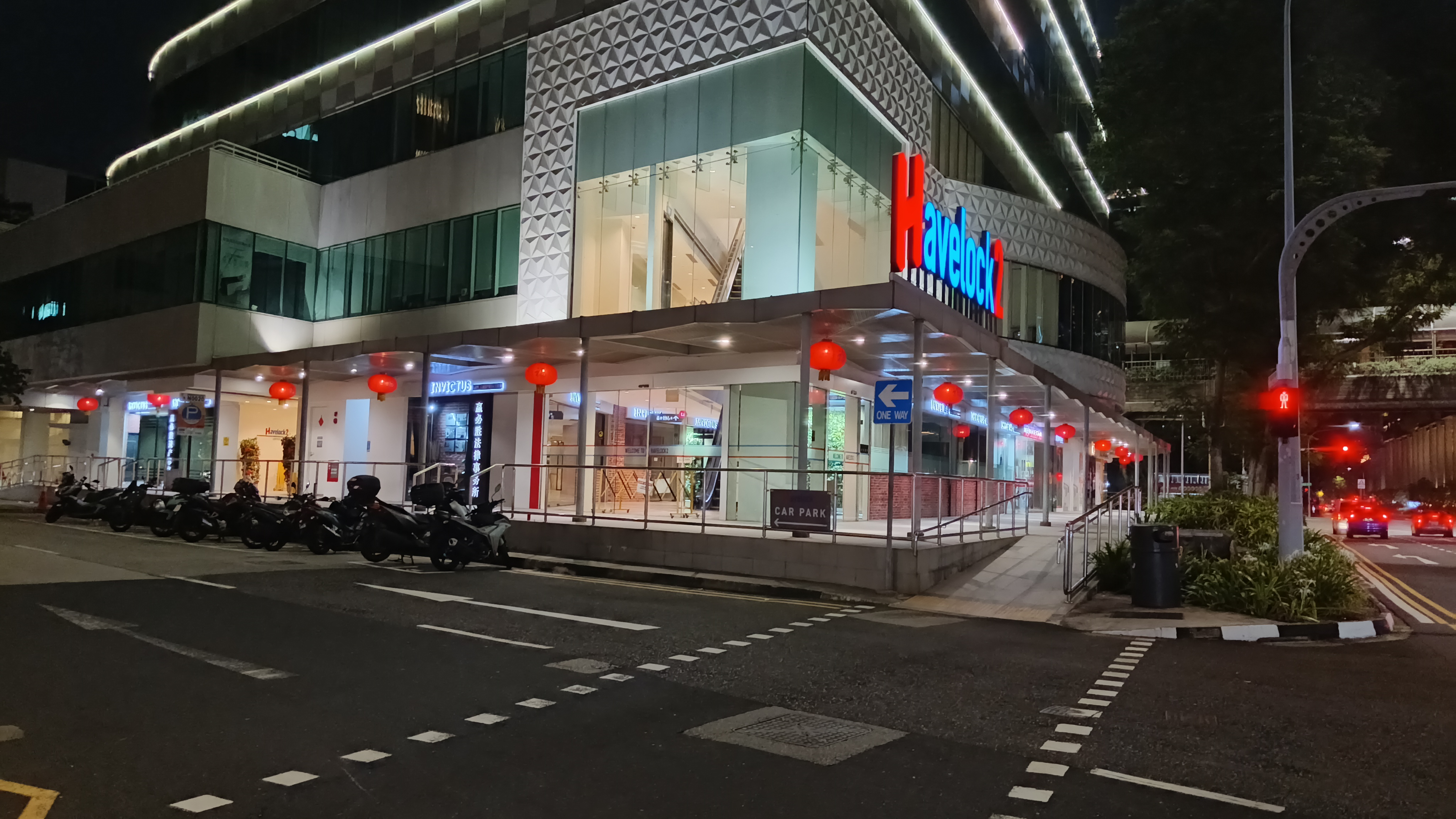
- The starting point of Havelock Road at night.
- Interactive map of Havelock Road
- Owner: Land Transport Authority (LTA)
- Maintained by: LTA
- Nearest Mass Rapid Transit System station: Havelock MRT station

Other
- Known for: Connecting Outram and Chinatown to Tiong Bahru; The Warehouse Hotel

Havelock Road is a street in the Central Region, Singapore, which starts at Eu Tong Sen Street in Chinatown, passes through Pulau Saigon, breaks downwards at Zion Road and finally ends at the meeting point of Alexandra Road, Ganges Avenue, and Delta Road in Tiong Bahru. This road essentially connects the Outram district to the Tiong Bahru neighbourhood. It is named after General Sir Henry Havelock, who led British troops in the 1857 Sepoy Mutiny. The road also has its own dedicated MRT station, which is the Havelock MRT station that was opened in 2022.

== Offshoots ==
The following streets are offshoots from the main Havelock Road:

- New Market Road
- Keng Cheow Street
- Solomon Street
- Magazine Road
- Clemenceau Avenue
- Chin Swee Road
- Saiboo Street
- Kim Seng Road
- Zion Road
- Havelock Link
- Indus Road

== Prominent landmarks ==
- Geok Tiong Han Temple: Built in 1887 by a Chinese merchant named Chang Hong Lim, the temple is the oldest Chinese temple in Singapore. The temple has survived multiple fires in close proximity to it, with two notable occasions in 1961 and 1968. It is alternatively known as the Jade Emperor Temple and is a place of worship for Buddhists, Taoists and Confucianists alike.
- Alkaff Bridge: A 55-metre long bridge built in 1997 at the Robertson Quay and named in homage to the Alkaff family of Arab merchants. It is part of the Pulau Saigon area and overlooks the Singapore River.
- Masjid Omar Kampong Melaka: The oldest mosque in Singapore, built in 1820 by Syed Omar Aljunied. It is located along Keng Cheow Street, an offshoot of Havelock Road. The mosque is the 59th national heritage monument of Singapore. In the courtyard is an ensemble of tombs belonging to the founder and his direct family.
- The Warehouse Hotel: The original building, a warehouse that was built in 1895, was converted into a hotel in 2017 which has thirty-seven rooms. The hotel has been gazetted for conservation by the Urban Redevelopment Authority due to its architectural significance.
- Orh Kio Tau: Built atop a pipeline, this bridge was located along Havelock Road, across a canal that lead into the Singapore River. Virtually nothing remains of the Orh Kio Tau bridge in the modern day after land reclamation, except for the pipeline the bridge was built on top of, which is still preserved to this day.

== Commercial amenities ==
At the starting point of Havelock Road is the seven-storey Havelock 2 commercial complex, which consists of a shopping mall on the bottom five levels including the basement and corporate business offices on the top two levels. Stores in the complex include an unofficial fan-owned Transformers store, where both recent and old Transformers collectibles can be purchased. The commercial complex is currently owned by Master Contract Services, after the former owner Alpha Investments sold it for a total of $250,000,000.

Towards the end of Havelock Road, there is an NTUC FairPrice outlet that serves the Bukit Ho Swee neighborhood.

== See also ==
- Tiong Bahru
- Outram, Singapore
