= List of bridges in Singapore =

This is a list of flyovers, bridges and viaducts in Singapore, including those for pedestrians and vehicular traffic.

In Singapore, a flyover is an overpass that crosses over another road, while a bridge is a structure that crosses a body of water. A viaduct usually refers to a flyover that crosses over multiple roads and spans several kilometres.

Only structures that are officially named are listed below. There are many more bridges in various parts of Singapore and its outlying islands that exist without names.

== Pedestrian bridges ==
Bridge	Crosses over	Ref
Alkaff Bridge	Singapore River	
Anderson Bridge	Singapore River	
Cavenagh Bridge	Singapore River	
Helix Bridge	Marina Bay	
Jiak Kim Bridge	Singapore River	
Jubilee Bridge	Marina Bay	
Marina Bridge	Marina Channel	
Ord Bridge	Singapore River	
Read Bridge	Singapore River	
Robertson Bridge	Singapore River	
Tanjong Rhu Footbridge	Geylang River	

== Pedestrian overhead bridges ==
Bridge	Crosses over
Alexandra Arch	Alexandra Road
Garden Bay Bridge	Bayfront Avenue
Henderson Waves	Henderson Road

== Vehicular bridges ==
Bridge	Road	Crosses over	Location
Anchorvale Bridge	Anchorvale Street	Sungei Punggol	
Bayfront Bridge	Bayfront Avenue	Marina Bay	
Benjamin Sheares Bridge	East Coast Parkway (ECP)	Kallang Basin, Marina Bay	
Buangkok Bridge	Buangkok East Drive	Sungei Serangoon	
Changi Village Bridge	Nicoll Drive	Changi Creek	
Chong Pang Bridge	Lentor Avenue	Sungei Seletar	1°24′10.7″N 103°49′38.9″E
Clemenceau Bridge	Clemenceau Avenue	Singapore River	
Coleman Bridge	Eu Tong Sen Street, New Bridge Road	Singapore River	
Coral Bridge (Sentosa)	Coral Island	Sentosa Cove	
Crawford Bridge	Crawford Street	Rochor River	
Dorset Bridge	Dorset Road, Keng Lee Road	Bukit Timah Canal	1°18′41.6″N 103°50′52.2″E
Former Edinburgh Bridge	Edinburgh Road	Formerly above-ground Stamford Canal	1°17′59.5″N 103°50′37.8″E
Elgin Bridge	North Bridge Road, South Bridge Road	Singapore River	
Esplanade Bridge	Esplanade Drive	Marina Bay	
Gambas Bridge	Gambas Avenue	Sungei Sembawang	1°26′40.9″N 103°48′38.9″E
Geylang Bahru Bridge	Geylang Bahru, Upper Boon Keng Road	Kallang River	
Halus Bridge	Tampines Expressway (TPE)	Sungei Serangoon	
Hampshire Bridge	Hampshire Road	Bukit Timah Canal	
Jalan Ahmad Ibrahim Bridge	Ayer Rajah Expressway (AYE)	Sungei Jurong	
Jelutong Bridge (Pulau Ubin)	Jalan Jelutong	Sungei Jelutong	
Former Kandang Kerbau Bridge	Bukit Timah Road	Formerly above-ground Bukit Timah Canal	1°18′29.2″N 103°50′50.3″E
Keppel Bay Bridge	Keppel Bay Vista	Keppel Harbour	
Kim Seng Bridge	Kim Seng Road	Singapore River	
Merdeka Bridge	Nicoll Highway	Kallang Basin	
Montgomery Bridge	Serangoon Road	Kallang River	
Noordin Bridge (Pulau Ubin)	Jalan Noordin	Sungei Noordin	
Paradise Bridge (Sentosa)	Paradise Island	Sentosa Cove	
Pasir Ris Bridge	Pasir Ris Industrial Drive 1	Sungei Serangoon	
Pearl Bridge (Sentosa)	Pearl Island	Sentosa Cove	
Puaka Bridge (Pulau Ubin)	Jalan Endut Senin	Sungei Puaka	
Pulau Saigon Bridge	Saiboo Street	Singapore River	
Punggol Bridge	Tampines Expressway (TPE)	Sungei Punggol	
Punggol Barat Bridge	Punggol Barat Drive	Seletar Wet Gap	
Sandy Bridge (Sentosa)	Sandy Island	Sentosa Cove	
Seletar Bridge		Sungei Punggol	
Sembawang Way Bridge	Sembawang Way	Sungei Sembawang	
Sengkang West Bridge	Sengkang East Avenue, Sengkang West Avenue	Sungei Punggol	
Sir Arthur's Bridge	Geylang Road	Kallang River	
Sungei Jurong Bridge	Jalan Buroh	Sungei Jurong	
Sungei Pandan Bridge	Jalan Buroh	Sungei Pandan	
Syed Alwi Bridge	Syed Alwi Road	Rochor Canal	
Tanjong Rhu Bridge	Stadium Way	Geylang River	
Toa Payoh Bridge	Jalan Toa Payoh, Pan Island Expressway (PIE)	Kallang River	
Tongkang Bridge			
Treasure Bridge (Sentosa)	Treasure Island	Sentosa Cove	
Victoria Bridge	Kallang Road, Victoria Street	Rochor River	
Wrexham Bridge	Wrexham Road, Wrexham Avenue, Jalan Ahmad Ibrahim (AYE), Tuas West Drive	Tengeh Reservoir	

== Vehicular flyovers ==
Flyover	Road	Crosses over
Aljunied Flyover	Pan Island Expressway (PIE)	Aljunied Road
Aljunied West Flyover	Slip road connecting Sims Way and PIE	Jalan Kolam Ayer, PIE
Anak Bukit Flyover	PIE	Bukit Timah Road, Jalan Anak Bukit, Rifle Range Road, Upper Bukit Timah Road
Ang Mo Kio Central Flyover	Central Expressway (CTE)	Ang Mo Kio Avenue 3
Ang Mo Kio North Flyover	CTE	Ang Mo Kio Avenue 5
Ang Mo Kio South Flyover	CTE	Ang Mo Kio Avenue 1
Api Api Flyover	Tampines Expressway (TPE)	Pasir Ris Drive 12, Tampines Avenue 10
Bahar Flyover	PIE	Jalan Bahar
Bedok North Flyover	Bedok North Road, Slip road connecting Bedok North Road and PIE	PIE
Bedok Reservoir Flyover	PIE	Bedok North Avenue 3
Benoi Flyover	Ayer Rajah Expressway (AYE)	Benoi Road, Jalan Ahmad Ibrahim
Bishan Flyover	Braddell Road	Bishan Road
Braddell Flyover	CTE	Braddell Road
Buangkok Flyover	Buangkok East Drive	Kallang–Paya Lebar Expressway (KPE)
Bukit Batok Flyover	PIE	Bukit Batok Road, Jurong Town Hall Road
Bukit Merah Flyover	CTE	Jalan Bukit Merah
Bukit Panjang Flyover	Upper Bukit Timah Road, Woodlands Road	Bukit Panjang Road, Choa Chu Kang Road
Bukit Timah Seven Mile Flyover	Jalan Anak Bukit	Bukit Timah Road
Buona Vista Flyover	North Buona Vista Road	AYE
Buroh Flyover	West Coast Highway	Jalan Buroh
Changi Airport Aircraft Flyover	Aircraft taxiway in Singapore Changi Airport	Airport Boulevard
Changi Flyover	PIE	East Coast Parkway (ECP)
Chantek Flyover	Bukit Timah Expressway (BKE)	PIE
Choa Chu Kang East Flyover	Choa Chu Kang Drive	Kranji Expressway (KJE)
Choa Chu Kang West Flyover	Choa Chu Kang Way	KJE
Clementi Flyover	Clementi Avenue 2	AYE
Clementi North Flyover	Slip road connecting Clementi Avenue 6 and PIE	PIE
Corporation Flyover	AYE	Corporation Road, Jalan Ahmad Ibrahim, Jurong Port Road
Dairy Farm Flyover	BKE	Dairy Farm Road
Defu Flyover	KPE	Tampines Road
Eng Neo Flyover	PIE	Eng Neo Avenue
Eunos Flyover	PIE	Jalan Eunos
Farrer Flyover	Adam Road, Farrer Road	Bukit Timah Road, Dunearn Road
Gali Batu Flyover	KJE	BKE
Gillman Flyover	Alexandra Road	AYE
Henderson Flyover	Henderson Road	AYE
Hillview Flyover	Upper Bukit Timah Road	Dairy Farm Road, Hillview Road
Holland Flyover	Holland Road	Farrer Road, Queensway
Hong Kah Flyover	PIE	Jurong West Avenue 2
Jalan Kayu Flyover	Jalan Kayu	TPE
Jurong East Flyover	Bukit Batok Avenue 1, Jurong East Central	PIE
Jurong Hill Flyover	AYE	Jalan Ahmad Ibrahim, Jalan Boon Lay, Jurong Pier Road
Jurong Pier Flyover	Jurong Pier Road	Jalan Buroh, Jurong Pier Circus
Kallang Bahru Flyover	Slip road connecting PIE and Sims Way	Jalan Kolam Ayer, Pelton Canal
Kallang Way Flyover	Sims Way	PIE
Kampong Bahru Flyover	Kampong Bahru Road	AYE
Kampong Java Flyover	CTE	Kampong Java Road, Keng Lee Road, Thomson Road
Keppel Flyover	Keppel Road	Keppel Road
Kim Keat Flyover	Kim Keat Link	PIE
Laguna Flyover	Bedok South Avenue 1	ECP
Lam San Flyover	KJE	Brickland Road, Sungei Tengah Road
Lentor Flyover	Seletar Expressway (SLE), Slip road connecting SLE and Lentor Avenue	Lentor Avenue, Lower Seletar Close
Lower Delta Flyover	Lower Delta Road	AYE
Loyang Flyover	TPE	Loyang Avenue, Tampines Avenue 7
Mandai Flyover	BKE	Mandai Road
Mandai Lake Flyover	Mandai Road	SLE
Marine Parade Flyover	Still Road South	ECP
Marsiling Flyover	SLE	Woodlands Avenue 2
Marymount Flyover	Marymount Road	Braddell Road
Moulmein Flyover	CTE	Balestier Road
Mount Pleasant Flyover	Mount Pleasant Road	PIE
Nanyang Flyover	PIE	Pioneer Road North
Nee Soon Flyover	Mandai Road	SLE
Newton Flyover	Bukit Timah Road, Dunearn Road	Newton Circus
Ophir Flyover	Ophir Road	Nicoll Highway
Outram Flyover	CTE	Outram Road
Oxley Flyover	Fort Canning Road	Clemenceau Avenue
Pandan Flyover	Clementi Avenue 6	AYE
Pasir Laba Flyover	PIE	Upper Jurong Road
Pasir Ris Flyover	Pasir Ris Drive 8, Tampines Avenue 12	TPE
Paya Lebar Flyover	PIE	Paya Lebar Road
Penjuru Flyover	Jalan Buroh	Penjuru Road
Pioneer Flyover	AYE	Pioneer Circus, Pioneer Road
Portsdown Flyover	Portsdown Avenue	AYE
Punggol East Flyover	Punggol East, Sengkang East Drive	TPE
Punggol Flyover	Punggol Road	TPE
Punggol West Flyover	Punggol Way, Sengkang East Road	TPE
Queensway Flyover	Portsdown Avenue, Queensway	Rail Corridor
Radin Mas Flyover	CTE	AYE
Rifle Range Flyover	Rifle Range Road	BKE
Rochor Flyover	Rochor Road	Nicoll Highway
Seletar Aerospace Flyover	Seletar Aerospace Way, Sengkang West Road	TPE
Seletar Flyover	Seletar West Link, Slip road connecting CTE and Seletar West Link, Slip road connecting SLE and TPE	SLE, TPE
Seletar Link Flyover	Seletar Link, Sengkang West Drive	TPE
Sembawang Flyover	Mandai Avenue	SLE
Senja Flyover	Senja Road	KJE
T4 Flyover	T4 Flyover	Airport Boulevard
Tampines Flyover	KPE	TPE
Tampines South Flyover	Simei Avenue	PIE
Tanah Merah Flyover	Xilin Avenue	ECP
Tanjong Katong Flyover	Tanjong Katong Road South	ECP
Tanjong Rhu Flyover	ECP	Fort Road, Marina East Drive
Teban Flyover	AYE	Jurong Town Hall Road
Telok Ayer Flyover	AYE	Keppel Road
Tengah Flyover	PIE, Slip road connecting KJE and PIE	KJE, PIE
Thomson Flyover	PIE	Thomson Road
Toa Payoh North Flyover	Lorong 6 Toa Payoh	Braddell Road
Toa Payoh South Flyover	Lorong 2 Toa Payoh	PIE, Slip road connecting PIE and Thomson Road
Toh Guan Flyover	Toh Guan Road	PIE
Toh Tuck Flyover	PIE	Bukit Batok East Avenue 3, Toh Tuck Avenue
Tuas Flyover	AYE	PIE, Tuas Road
Turf Club Flyover	Turf Club Avenue	Unnamed road that leads to the facilities of the Singapore Turf Club
Ulu Sembawang Flyover	SLE	Woodlands Avenue 12
Upper Changi Flyover	TPE, Upper Changi Road East	PIE
Upper Seletar Flyover	SLE	Mandai Road - Track 7
Upper Thomson Flyover	SLE	Upper Thomson Road
University Flyover	Clementi Road	AYE
Whampoa Flyover	CTE, Slip road connecting CTE and PIE	Jalan Toa Payoh, PIE
Woodlands Flyover	BKE	Woodlands Avenue 3
Woodlands South Flyover	SLE, Slip road connecting Turf Club Avenue and BKE, Slip road connecting Turf Club Avenue and SLE	BKE
Woodsville Flyover	Jalan Kolam Ayer, Jalan Toa Payoh, PIE	Bendemeer Road, MacPherson Road, Serangoon Road, Upper Serangoon Road
Yew Tee Flyover	KJE, Slip road connecting KJE and Woodlands Road	Woodlands Road, Slip road connecting KJE and Woodlands Road
Yio Chu Kang Flyover	CTE	Yio Chu Kang Road
Zhenghua Flyover	BKE	Bukit Panjang Road

== Vehicular viaducts ==
Viaduct	Road
Bartley Viaduct	Bartley Road East
Keppel Viaduct	Ayer Rajah Expressway (AYE)
Labrador Viaduct	West Coast Highway
Lornie Viaduct	Braddell Road
MacRitchie Viaduct	Lornie Road, Thomson Road
Serangoon Viaduct	Upper Serangoon Road
Tampines Viaduct	Tampines Expressway (TPE) (eastbound) to PIE (westbound) and Upper Changi Road
Tuas Checkpoint Viaduct	Ayer Rajah Expressway (AYE), Tuas Checkpoint
Tuas Viaduct	Tuas Road, Pioneer Road, Tuas West Road
Woodlands Checkpoint Viaduct	Bukit Timah Expressway (BKE), Woodlands Checkpoint

== See also ==
- List of underpasses and tunnels in Singapore
