= Great World (disambiguation) =

Great World is an integrated entertainment complex in Shanghai, China.

Great World or The Great World may also refer to:

- Great World Amusement Park, a former amusement park in Singapore
  - Great World Shopping Centre, a shopping centre built on the site of the former amusement park
  - Great World MRT station, the Mass Rapid Transit station serving the shopping centre
- The Great World, a novel by David Malouf
- The Great World and the Small: More Tales of the Ominous and Magical, a collection of short stories authored by Darrell Schweitzer

== See also ==
- A Great Big World
- 大世界 (disambiguation)
