= 大世界 =

大世界 (Hanyu Pinyin: Dà Shìjìe; lit. 'great world') may refer to:

- Great World, an amusement park in Shanghai, China
  - Dashijie, a station of the Shanghai Metro
- Great World Amusement Park, a former amusement park in Singapore
  - Great World, a station of the Mass Rapid Transit (MRT) station in Singapore
- Have a Nice Day, 2017 Chinese animated film
- It's a Great, Great World, 2011 Singaporean film

== See also ==
- The dictionary definition of 大 at Wiktionary
- The dictionary definition of 世 at Wiktionary
- The dictionary definition of 界 at Wiktionary
- Great World (disambiguation)
- 新世界 (disambiguation)
