= Tan Kim Seng =

Singaporean merchant and philanthropist (1805–1864)

Tan Kim Seng JP
- 陳金聲
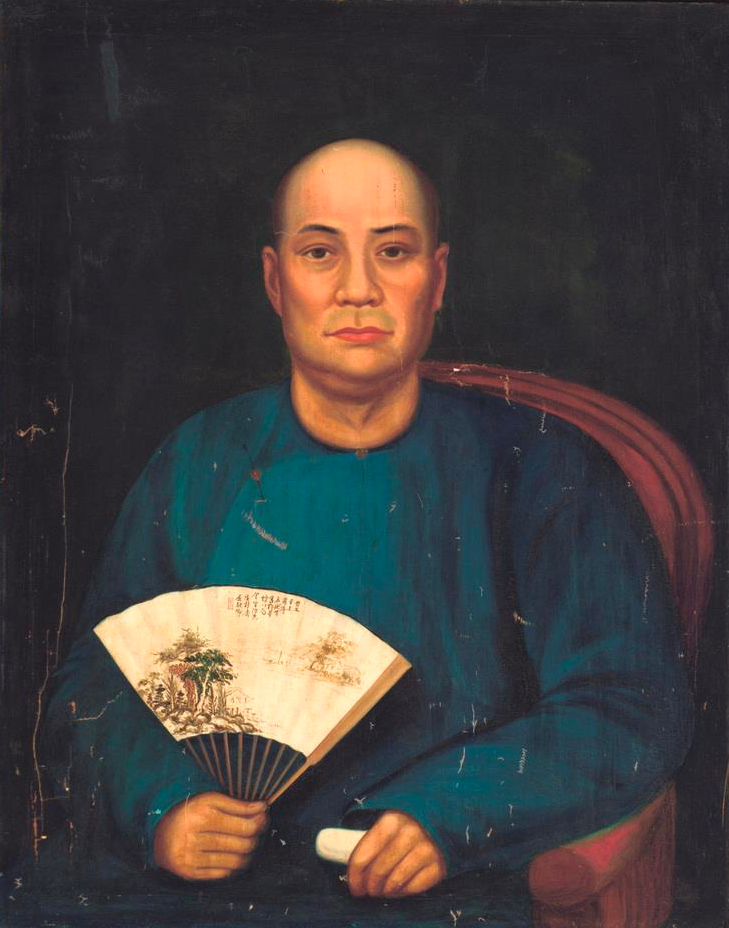
- Born: 18 November 1805; Dutch Malacca
- Died: 14 March 1864 (aged 58); Malacca, Straits Settlements
- Resting place: Malacca, Malaysia
- Monuments: Tan Kim Seng Fountain
- Occupations: Merchant, businessman, justice of the peace
- Employer(s): Kim Seng and Company
- Known for: A prominent Hokkien merchant and philanthropist and Hokkien community leader in 19th century Singapore.
- Spouse: Lim Tew Neo (m. 1829–1864)
- Children: Tan Beng Swee (son); Tan Geok Hup (daughter); Tan Beng Gwee (son); Tan Beng Gum (son); Tan Geok Ee (daughter); Tan Beng Guat (son)
- Parents: Tan Swee Poh (father); Goh Kan Neo (mother)
- Relatives: Tan Boon Chiang (great-great grandson)

Chinese name
- Traditional Chinese: 陳金聲
- Simplified Chinese: 陈金声
Transcriptions
Standard Mandarin
- Hanyu Pinyin: Chén Jīnshēng
Southern Min
- Hokkien POJ: Tân Kim-seng

Tan Kim Seng JP (18 November 1805 – 14 March 1864), was a prominent Straits-born Chinese merchant and philanthropist in Singapore in the 19th century.

== Biography ==
Born in Malacca in 1805 to Tan Swee Poh (Chinese: 陳瑞布; pinyin: Chén Ruìbù; Pe̍h-ōe-jī: Tân Sūi-pò͘), he was the grandson of Tan Sin Liew (Chinese: 陳臣留; pinyin: Chén Chénliú; Pe̍h-ōe-jī: Tân Sîn-liû). Tan came to Singapore where he made a fortune as a trader. He started his firm, Kim Seng and Company, in 1840 and amassed a large fortune in his lifetime. His public acts of charity includes endowing a Chinese Free School, supporting the Tan Tock Seng Hospital, and improving the public waterworks in 19th century Singapore.

Tan donated generously to the building and maintenance of a school for boys known as Chui Eng Institute (Chinese: 萃英書院; pinyin: Cuìyīng Shūyuàn; Pe̍h-ōe-jī: Chūi-eng Su-īⁿ). The school was originally taught in Hokkien and was known as the top school in Singapore at the time.

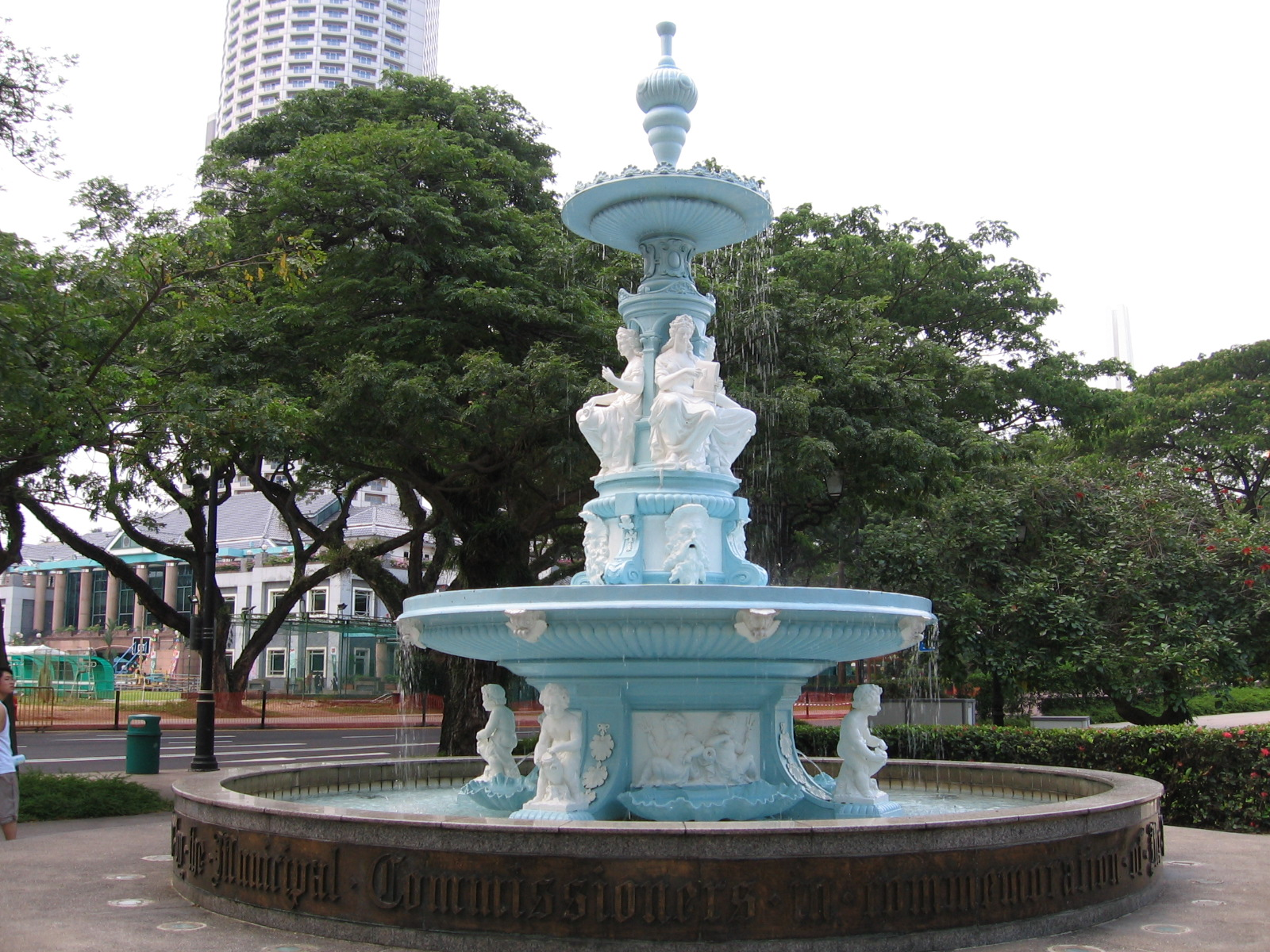
The Tan Kim Seng Fountain at the Esplanade Park was built to commemorate Tan Kim Seng's contributions to the first public waterworks in Singapore.

One of Tan's best-known donations was the sum of $13,000 in 1857 towards building Singapore's first public waterworks to ensure a better freshwater supply to the town. The Tan Kim Seng Fountain was erected by the Municipal Commissioners to commemorate Tan's donation. However, his donation was squandered away by the Government Engineer, who hoped to make water run uphill through water pipes. In 1882, possibly out of shame and to mark the British colonial government's appreciation, the fountain was installed in Fullerton Square to perpetuate his name. The fountain was moved to Battery Road in 1905 and later in 1925 to the Esplanade Park where it currently stands.

Tan was also the first magistrate of Chinese descent in Singapore. He was the acknowledged Chinese leader in Singapore and Malacca, and was made a Justice of the Peace in 1850, after his father's death. He was appointed the Municipal Commission's first Asian member in 1857. His numerous contributions to the society includes the suppression of the secret society riots in 1854 between the Cantonese and the Hoklo (Hokkien) communities.

Tan gave lavish parties in which he would invite the Europeans as well as other prominent members of Singapore society of all races. A European guest who was there at his first ball, said of the feast:

"It was a chaos of dainties, each more tempting than the other. All the fruits of the Indian Archipelago, of India, China and the West — some in their natural state, others exquisitely preserved — were piled around us."

Upon his death in 1864, Tan had amassed immense wealth that stemmed most notably from his control over Singapore's waterworks system and his own real estate holdings. It is estimated that Tan owned 50–60% of the land in Singapore.

== Legacy ==
Tan built a road in River Valley which still carries his name — Kim Seng Road. This road led through Tan's property in the area. Jiak Kim Street and Jiak Chuan Road are named after his two prominent grandsons Tan Jiak Kim (Chinese: 陳若錦; pinyin: Chén Ruòjǐn; Pe̍h-ōe-jī: Tân Jio̍k-kím) and Tan Jiak Chuan (Chinese: 陳若銓; pinyin: Chén Ruòquán; Pe̍h-ōe-jī: Tân Jio̍k-chhoan) respectively. Kim Seng Road is known to the Hokkiens as hong hin lo, meaning "Hong Hin road".

One of the last landscape vestiges connected with the Tan family in this area is the house, Panglima Prang (Admiral of the Fleet) on River Valley Road. It served as the early home of Tan Jiak Kim, who was a great-grandfather of former President of Singapore Tony Tan. This house was built in the 1860s and demolished around 1982.

Kim Seng Bridge across the Singapore River, carrying Kim Seng Road from River Valley Road to Havelock Road, was first constructed by Tan and was named after him. The cost of building the original bridge, as well as the other bearing his name in Malacca in 1862, which was opened by W.O. Cavenagh, Governor of the Straits Settlements, was defrayed by Tan. The bridge was rebuilt around 1950–1951.

== See also ==
- Tan Si Chong Su
- Tan Kim Seng Fountain
- Kim Seng Bridge
- Kim Seng Road
- MacRitchie Reservoir, Singapore's first reservoir
