= William Haxworth =

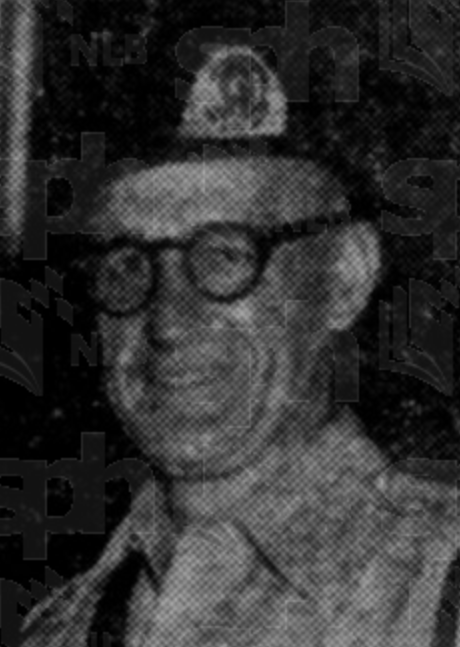
Haxworth in 1951

William Rupert Monkman Haxworth (1906 - 1985) was a police inspector, soldier and traffic chief in the Colony of Singapore. During the Japanese Occupation of Singapore, Haxworth was interned at Changi Prison and Sime Road internment camp, where he drew over three hundred paintings and sketches on whatever materials he could obtain depicting living conditions in the internment camps.

== Civil service ==
Prior to the Fall of Singapore, Haxworth worked as the Chief Investigator of the War Risks Insurance Department of the Singapore Treasury in the Singapore. During the Japanese Occupation of Singapore, Haxworth was detained by the Japanese and placed in Changi Prison.

After the Japanese surrendered in Singapore, Haxworth was released from internment. He was appointed Assistant Superintendent of the Police, and was appointed a Justice of the Peace for Singapore in December 1950. In May 1951, Haxworth succeeded G. D. Hunter-Gray as the traffic chief of Singapore. In March 1952, he received $100,000 to solve the traffic issues in Singapore. In April, he received the approval of the rural board to install roundabouts and traffic signs in certain rural areas.

Haxworth retired from his position in 1954, and left for England on 1 September. He held a farewell dinner at the Wing Choon Yuen restaurant in Great World on 30 August.

== Personal life ==
During the Japanese Occupation of Singapore, Haxworth was detained by the Japanese and placed in Changi Prison. He was later transferred to the Sime Road internment camp. During his internment in the internment camps, Haxworth used a variety of materials to create sketches, as he faced a shortage of paper and normal drawing materials. By the end of his internment, he had drawn over three hundred watercolour paintings, pencil sketches and crayon drawings. His drawings frequently portrayed fellow internees in the camps, and depicted fellow internees going from well-built men to being reduced to skin and bones by the end of the war. His paintings also frequently depicted the living conditions of the prisoners in the camp. He also often introduced bits of humour into his drawings.

Haxworth died in 1985. A year after his death, his wife donated the entire set of sketches to the National Archives of Singapore.
