= The Warehouse Hotel =

Hotel at Havelock Road, Singapore

Coordinates: 1.2892°N 103.8375°E

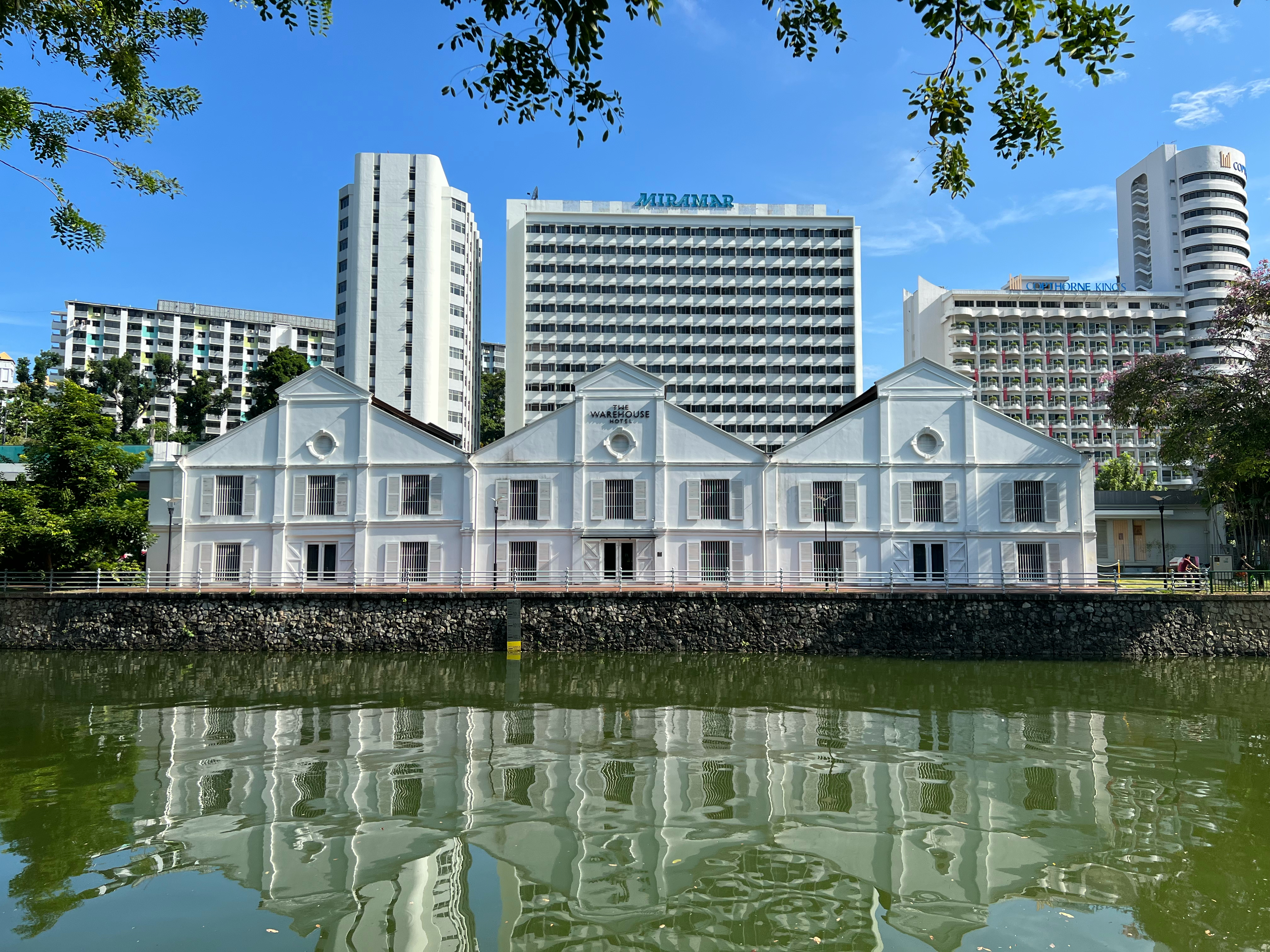
The hotel in 2022

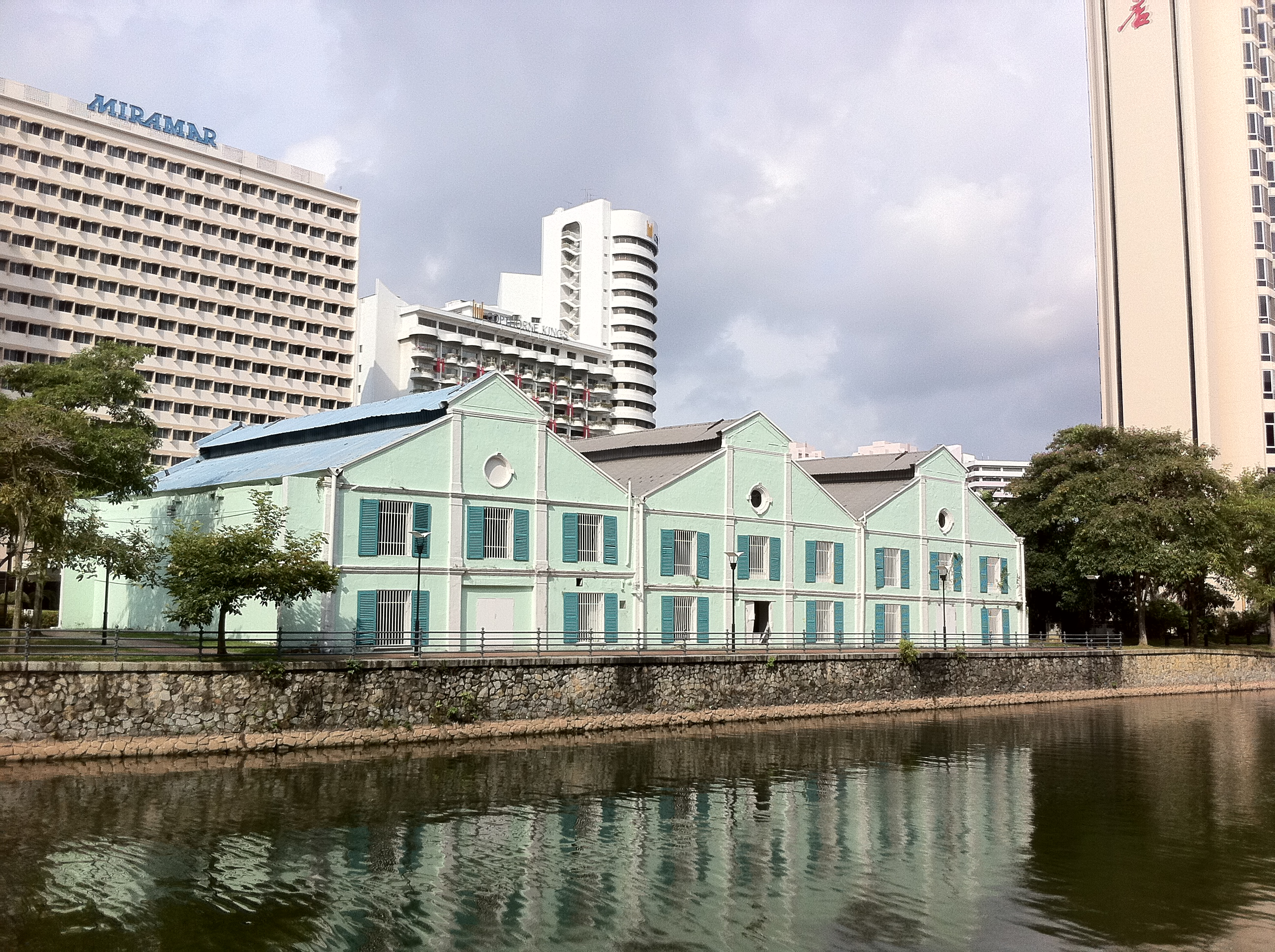
The warehouses in 2011, prior to being converted into a hotel

The Warehouse Hotel, formerly 320, 326 and 332 Havelock Road, is a boutique hotel housed in a row of three adjoining historic warehouses on Havelock Road within the Singapore River planning area. Completed in 1895, the building, which is "one of the oldest independently standing warehouses in Singapore", previously housed the Warehouse Disco, the country's largest discotheque.

== History ==
The buildings were completed in 1895 as warehouses used to store spices, rice and coffee, as well as tin and rubber. They were once occupied by the Ho Hong Oil Mills. The warehouses later became a "hotbed of secret society intrigue". It housed an opium den from 1895 to 1951. The Warehouse Disco, which was operated by the next-door River View Hotel opened in two of warehouses on 15 November 1986. Construction on the project cost $1.8 million. With a maximum capacity of 1,200 people and a dance floor with a capacity of 600 people, it was the largest disco in Singapore. It also contained the largest disco video screen in Singapore, as well as four bars, with one only serving champagne and wine. There was also a second smaller disco floor with a smaller disco video screen, as well as a soundproofed multi-purpose function room with a capacity of 40 people. The third warehouse served as a "fast food area" which was completed in the following year. In 2017, the restoration project received the Urban Redevelopment Authority Architectural Heritage Award.

On 11 May 1987, contestants of the Miss Universe 1987, which was held in Singapore, participated in a charity event organised by the River View Hotel at the disco. In the same year, the disco was one of five such establishments which refused to put up anti-AIDS posters as they were "bad for business". On 18 November 1990, a party celebrating the fifth anniversary of the founding of the Social Development Service was held at the disco, with over 1,000 members of the organisation participating and "many more" being turned away as the venue had already reached maximum capacity. However, following the opening of nightclubs which offered "all under one roof" entertainment, such as the Khameleon at Marina Village, Zouk at 17-21 Jiak Kim Street, Fire at Orchard Plaza and Disco On Air Park Avenue at Parkway Parade, the discotheque saw a major decline in business. As a result, the owners of the disco announced that it would be receiving a $500,000 renovation which was to be completed by May of the following year in order to compete with the newer establishments. The second floor was converted into a karaoke lounge with 9 KTV rooms. The warehouses again underwent renovations later in the year, after which 9 more KTV rooms were introduced.

After the disco closed down, the warehouses were left vacant, after which it fell into a state of disrepair. In July 2001, local theatre company Toy Factory Productions staged the Ho Ying Fung play The Seventh Drawer at the warehouses. Soon after, other local theatre companies, including Drama Box and The Theatre Practice also began staging plays at the venue. Fashion graduates of the LASALLE College of the Arts held a fashion show at the buildings as well. However, by then, there was no electricity or running water, with organisers having to bring their own power generators. In December 2004, local authorities rejected an application by Jungle Media to hold Snowball.04, an LGBT party which was to be held at the warehouses, calling it "contrary to public interest in general." In 2013, the government released the tender for the buildings, which were acquired by local hospitality firm Lo & Behold Group, who renovated and restore the warehouses. The restoration involved restoring the Chinese characters on the gable of the first warehouse which read "Ho Hong Oil Mills Limited" in Chinese. The security bars on the windows were also repaired. Portal frames were installed in addition to the original metal roof trusses while corrugated glass panels were installed on the roof to allow for natural lighting. The warehouses were gazetted for conservation by the Urban Redevelopment Authority in June 2014 as part of the Robertson Quay conservation area, which also includes other former warehouses, including the DBS Arts Centre, 72-13, the STPI - Creative Workshop & Gallery and 17-21 Jiak Kim Street.

=== The Warehouse Hotel ===
The 37-room Warehouse Hotel opened in the warehouses in January 2017. According to Evelyn Chen of The Daily Telegraph, who gave the hotel a rating of 8/10, the "lofty hotel lobby sports a sleek industrial design with intricate details that whisper of the property's past. The double-volume ceiling festooned with custom lightings inspired by pulleys found in godowns illuminate the space, while a feature wall in exposed brick harks back to the building’s heritage past." The rooms, which range from 27 sq m to 57 sq m in size, are divided into six categories, with the rooms on the top floor having tall ceilings but no windows. Olivia Ho of The Straits Times wrote: "No two of the hotel's 37 rooms, which range from skylit inner chambers to a mezzanine with a reading library, are alike." Sarah Stodola of CNN, who included the hotel on her list of the "best new options on the Singapore hotel scene", wrote that the rooms "all feature the same gray and gold tones, hardwood floors, Bang & Olufsen speakers, single-serve pour-over coffee in locally crafted mugs and wonderful rain showers and toiletries." She also noted that the hotel is "one of the few places in Singapore to serve a decently strong cocktail."

The hotel also features a cantilevered infinity pool that was built as an extension to the main building. An art installation by Dawn Ng can be found at the pool. The hotel also houses the restaurant Po. Ho wrote: "With its rattan chairs and green marble tabletops, it evokes a homely atmosphere, though the dishes are gussied up." Yeoh Wee Teck of The New Paper praised the restaurant's popiah, its version of the hokkien mee and its Iberico satay. However, he criticised the ice cream popiah dessert, which he called "impossible to roll" and "not worth the trouble." The Peak Magazine noted that parking space at the hotel is "limited". In a 2018 review for Condé Nast Traveler, Audrey Phoon wrote: "It's a tour de force by a team of Singaporean backers, designers, chefs and more – this is luxe local at its best." In a 2020 review for Nine.com.au, Sonia Taylor wrote: "Thanks to a great location, meticulous design and a focus on doing the simple things extremely well, The Warehouse Hotel continues to wow guests with its low-key industrial elegance and clever functionality." The hotel was also named the Hotel of the Year at the AHEAD Asia 2018 awards.
