= Ord Bridge =

Bridge in Singapore

Coordinates: 1°17′27.3″N 103°50′38.4″E

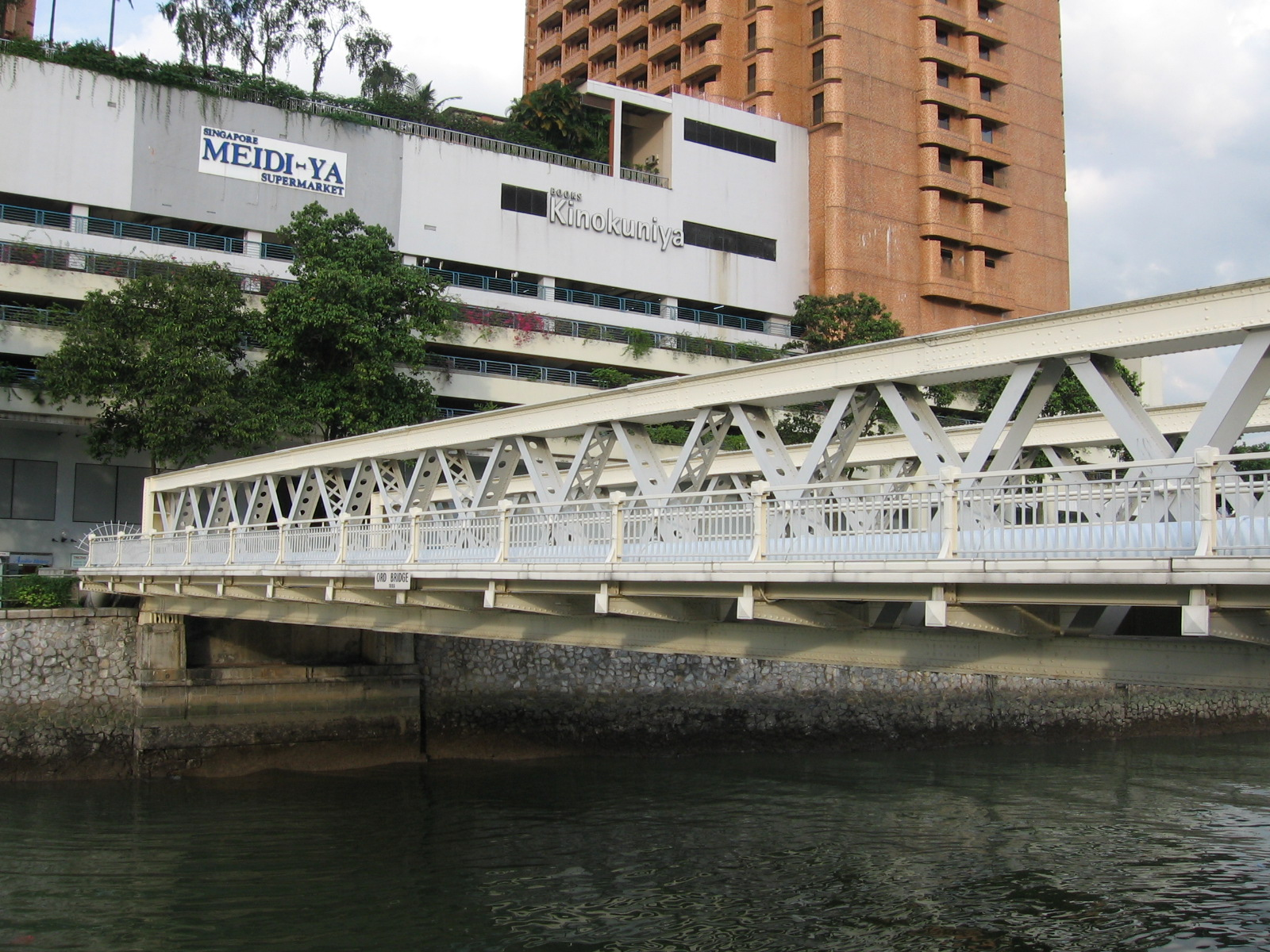
Ord Bridge spans the Singapore River

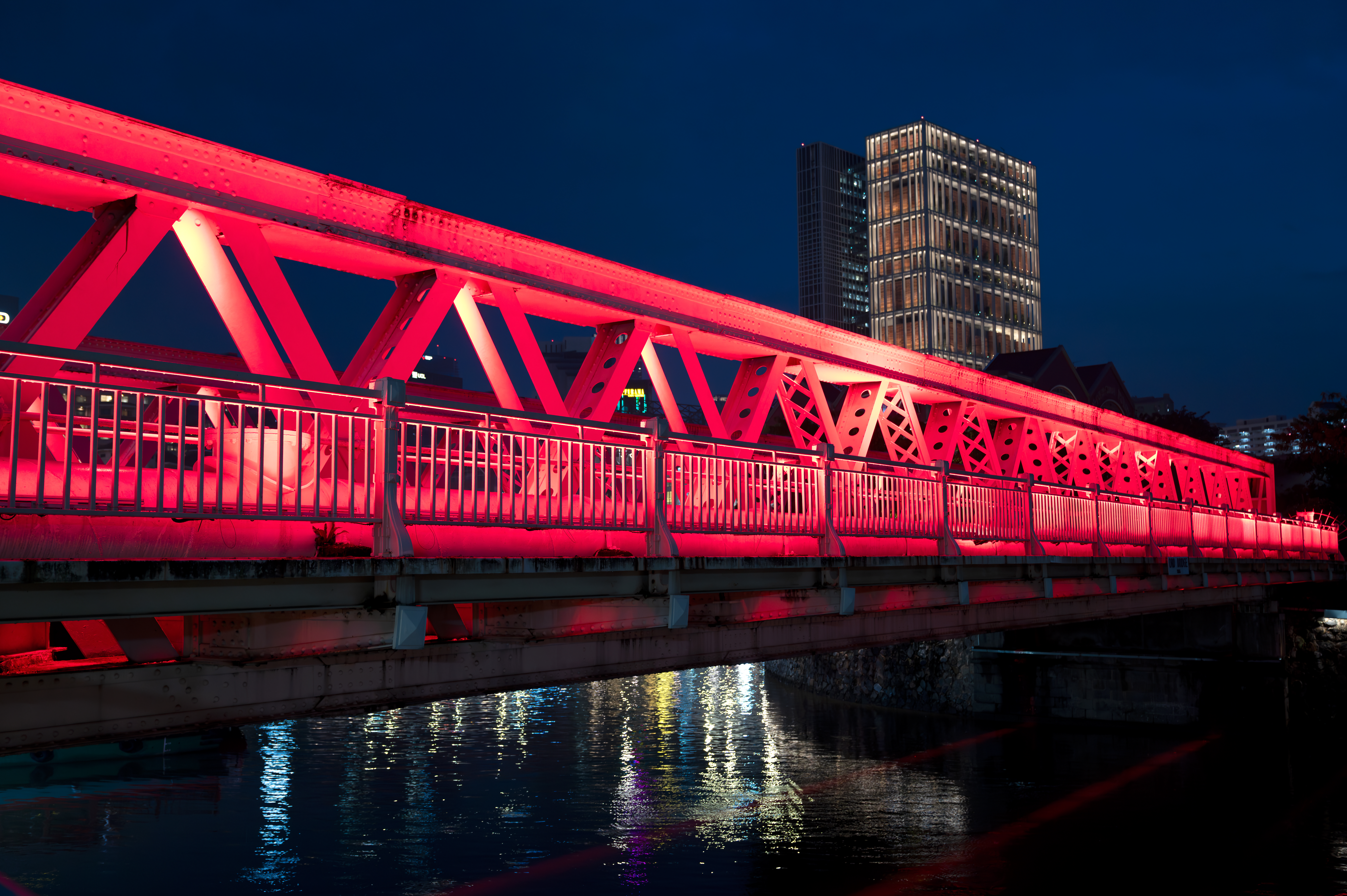
Illuminated Ord Bridge in 2024.

Ord Bridge (Chinese: 渥桥) is a pedestrian bridge in Singapore. It spans the Singapore River at Clarke Quay, located in the Singapore River Planning Area within the Central Area.

The Ord Bridge was built in 1886 to replace a demolished footbridge known as the ABC Bridge. The steel truss bridge was named after Colonel Sir Harry St. George Ord (1819–1885), the first British Governor of the Straits Settlements (1867–1873) after it was given the Crown Colony status.

The new name was also an abbreviation of its old name, Ordnance Bridge, which was a reference to the British ordnance depot along Magazine Road. It was also known as Toddy Bridge as there were toddy shops in nearby Pulau Saigon, an island on Singapore River which has since been reclaimed. Now it is commonly referred to as ORD bridge in relation to National servicemen reaching their operationally ready date, and celebrating at the bridge itself

On 3 November 2008, the bridge was selected for conservation as part of the Urban Redevelopment Authority's expanded conservation programme.

== See also ==
- List of bridges in Singapore
