= 新世界 =

新世界 (lit. 'new world') may refer to:

== Chinese ==
- New World Development (Chinese: 新世界), a Hong Kong property developer
  - New World Department Store China, a department store chain
  - New World Telecommunications, a defunct telecommunications company
- The New World (Chinese: 新世界), a 2015 Taiwanese TV series
- New World (Chinese: 新世界), 2020 Chinese TV series starring Sun Honglei and Zhang Luyi

== Japanese ==
- Shinsekai (Japanese: 新世界), a neighborhood in Osaka
- Shin Sekai (disambiguation)

== Korean ==
- Shinsegae (Korean: 신세계; Hanja: 新世界), a department store chain

== See also ==
- New World (disambiguation)
- 大世界 (disambiguation)
