= Shin Sekai (disambiguation) =

Shinsekai or Shin Sekai is a neighborhood in Osaka, Japan.

Shin Sekai or Shinsekai may also refer to

== Video games ==
- Shinsekai: Into the Depths, an adventure video game

== Music ==
- Shin Sekaï, French singing / rapping fusion duo
- Shin Sekai (album), a 2022 album by Mucc
- Shin Sekai ~Real of the World~, a 1989 album by Zi:Kill
- Shinsekai, a 2010 album by Midori
- "Shin Sekai", a song by DJ Krush feat. Rino from the 1997 album MiLight
- "Shin Sekai", a song by The Back Horn from the 2000 album Yomigaeru Hi
- "Shin Sekai", a song by Izabel Varosa from her album Justice
- "Shinsekai", a song by FLOW

== See also ==
- Shin Sekai Yori, the Japanese title of the novel From the New World
- 新世界 (disambiguation)
