= Jiak Chuan Road =

Road in Chinatown, Singapore

Coordinates: 1.2798°N 103.8396°E

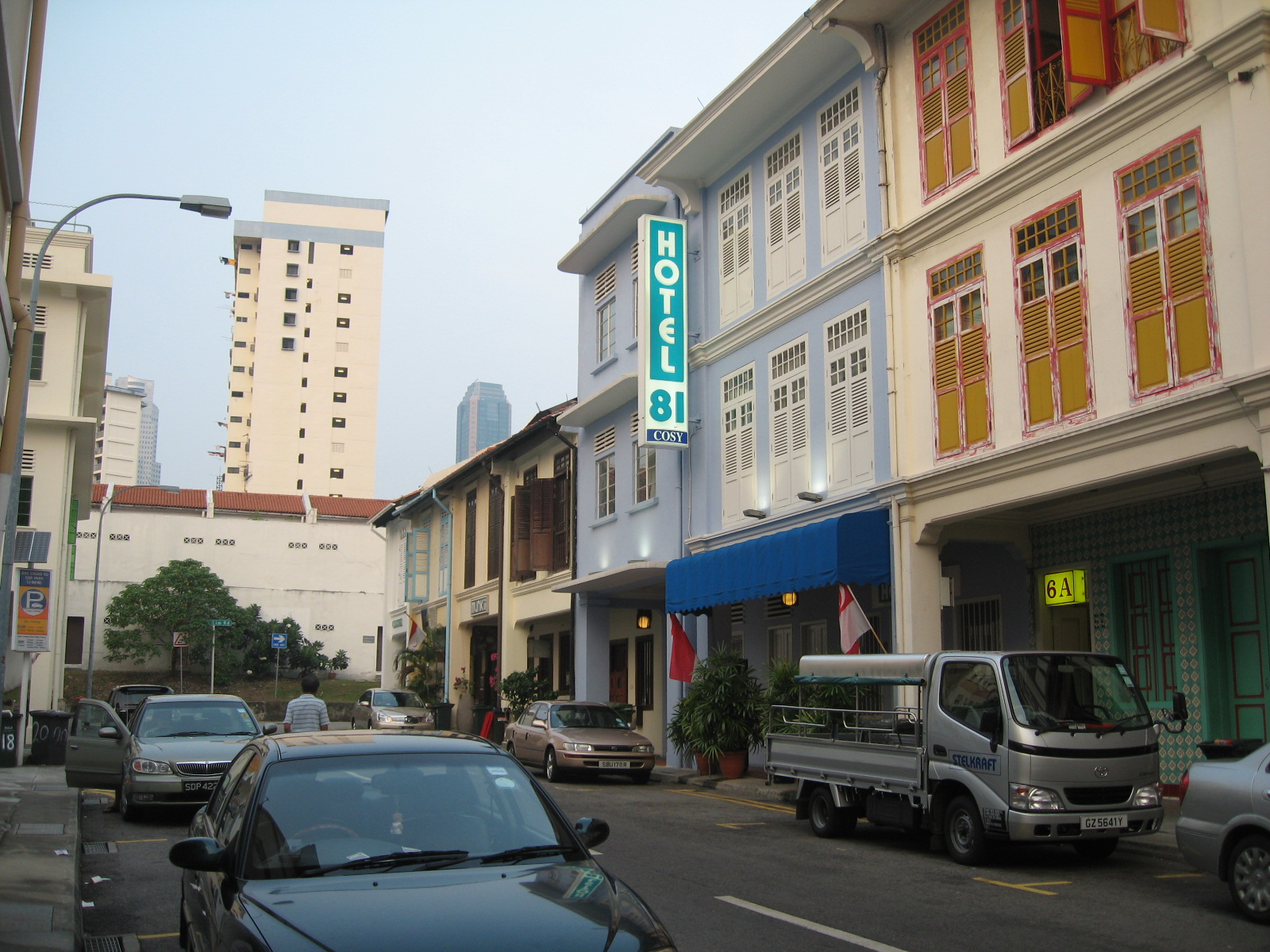
Jiak Chuan Road.

Jiak Chuan Road (Chinese: 若铨路; pinyin: Ruò quán lù) is a two-way road in Chinatown within the Outram Planning Area in Singapore. The road links Teck Lim Road to Keong Saik Road, it is home to several budget hotels and rows of shophouses. The place was formerly part of the Keong Saik Road red light district, home to numerous brothels.

== Etymology ==
The road is named after Tan Jiak Chuan, who is the grandson of philanthropist Tan Kim Seng.
