= Alkaff Bridge =

Pedestrian bridge in Singapore

Alkaff Bridge Jambatan Alkaff
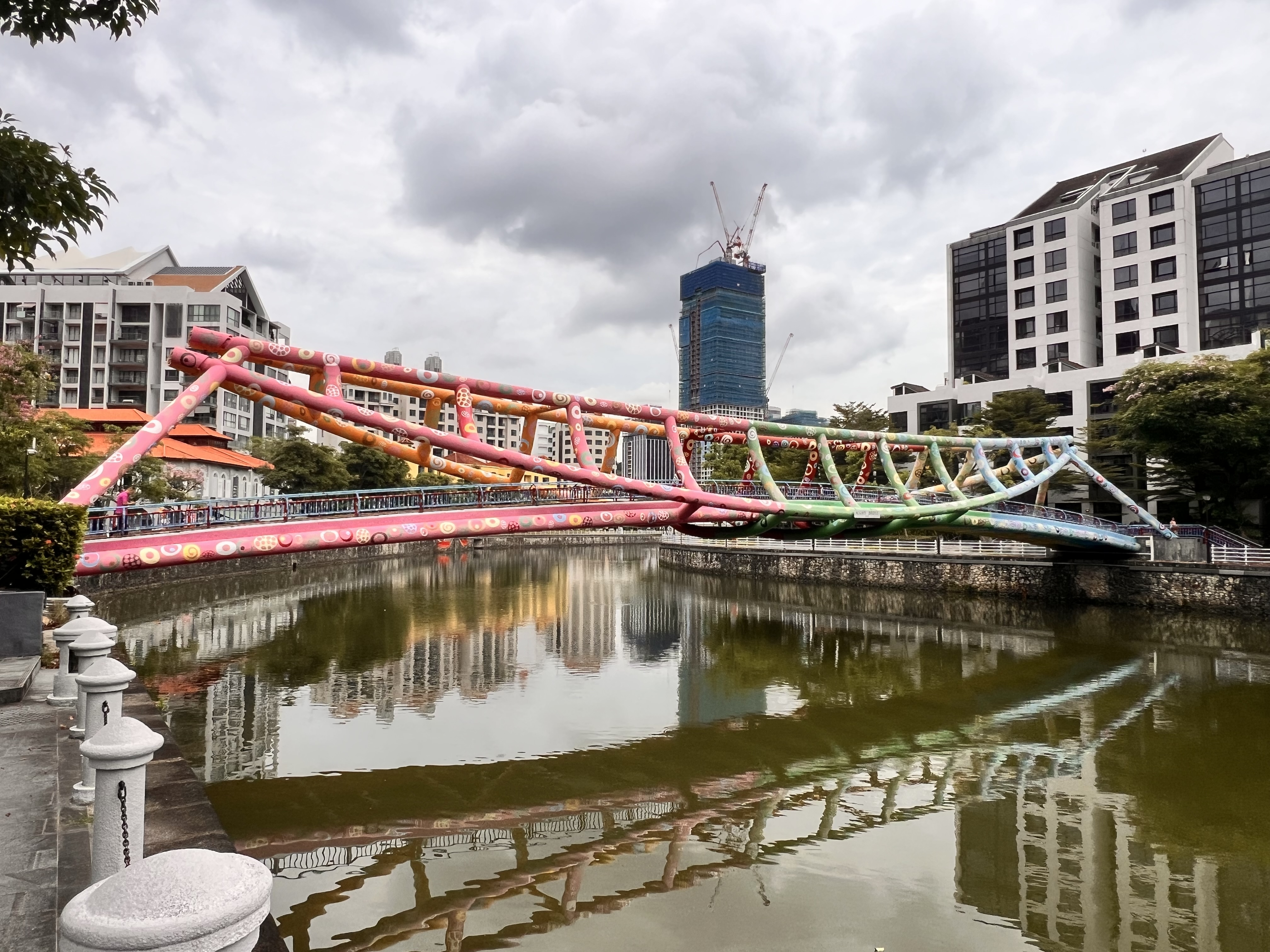
- Alkaff Bridge in November 2025
- Coordinates: 1°17′24″N 103°50′24″E
- Carries: Pedestrians
- Crosses: Singapore River
- Locale: Singapore River, Singapore
- Official name: Alkaff Bridge

Characteristics
- Design: Steel truss
- Total length: ~55 m

History
- Opened: 1999; 27 years ago

Location
- Interactive map of Alkaff Bridge

Alkaff Bridge is a pedestrian bridge in Singapore. It spans the Singapore River at Robertson Quay, located in the Singapore River planning area within the Central Area.

The steel truss bridge is 55 metres in length and weighs about 230 tonnes. It is shaped like a tongkang (a light boat used commonly in the early days to carry goods along rivers), and is situated near the former Alkaff Quay. Alkaff Quay was named after a prominent Arabian family, the Alkaffs, who were among the wealthiest in Singapore during the early 20th century.

The bridge was built in 1997, as part of the Urban Redevelopment Authority's (URA) plan to create a promenade along both banks of the Singapore River. The bridge, completed in 1999, is one of three footbridges — Alkaff Bridge, Robertson Bridge and Jiak Kim Bridge — built at Robertson Quay to improve the pedestrian connectivity between the two river banks. It was painted by internationally acclaimed visual artist Pacita Abad.

== Art bridge ==
The Alkaff Bridge was painted in January 2004 in vibrant colours by Filipino artist Pacita Abad (1946–2004) and a team of rope specialists. The artist and her crew of helpers used 55 different colours and more than 900 litres of industrial-strength paint to transform the bridge into Singapore's first "Bridge of Art".

ArtBridge Timeline

- March 2003

Artist Pacita Abad begins three-month Visiting Artists Program at the Singapore Tyler Print Institute (STPI)

- April 2003

Pacita conceives of project to paint the Alkaff bridge

- May 2003

STPI supports Pacita's ArtBridge project and begins to get the official approvals necessary to paint the Alkaff Bridge

- November 2003

STPI receives all of the necessary approvals for the ArtBridge project. The Land Transport Authority gives its support and the Singapore Tourism Board and City Developments Limited provide working capital for the project. Nippon Paint donates all the paint for the Bridge and Pacita selects 55 colors. Professional Industrial Rope Access Services Pte Ltd (PIRAS) agrees to paint the Bridge at a subsidized rate and Michelle Tan agrees to be the project manager

- December 2003

Pacita works with Visual Media Works to transform her colorful hand-painted Bridge sketches into detailed computerized workplans for the painters to follow.

- December 23, 2003

The project team begins the cleaning and painting of the Bridge

- December 28, 2003

The project team begins to paint the entire Bridge with a white primary base coat

- January 2, 2004

The project team follows Pacita's workplan and begins to paint each of the six sections of the Bridge in different base colors: yellow, pink, red, green, blue and orange

- January 10, 2004

The first of the 2,350 circle stencils in four designs and four sizes begin to arrive and are hand placed, one by one, on each of the Bridge's beams according to Pacita's workplan

- January 18, 2004

Each stencil is hand painted in a variety of colors and after the paint is dry, the stencils are removed one by one

- January 29, 2004

The "ArtBridge" is inaugurated

- February 12, 2004

As a final touch, the railings are hand painted by the artist with multiple circles

== See also ==
- List of bridges in Singapore
