= List of underpasses and tunnels in Singapore =

This is a list of underpasses and tunnels in Singapore. Only vehicular underpasses and tunnels with official names are shown below.

== List of underpasses ==
Underpass	Road	Crosses under
Adam Underpass	Slip road connecting PIE to Lornie Highway	Lornie Road
Anak Bukit Underpass	Jalan Anak Bukit	Jalan Jurong Kechil
Ang Mo Kio Underpass	Ang Mo Kio Avenue 3, Hougang Avenue 2	Yio Chu Kang Road
Braddell Underpass	Braddell Road	Central Expressway (CTE), Braddell Flyover
Bukit Timah Underpass	Bukit Timah Road	Adam Road, Farrer Road, Farrer Flyover
Clementi Avenue 6 Underpass	Clementi Avenue 6	Commonwealth Avenue West
Dunearn Underpass	Dunearn Road	Adam Road, Farrer Road, Farrer Flyover
Farrer Underpass	Farrer Road, Queensway	Holland Road, Holland Flyover
Lornie Underpass	Lornie Road	Lornie Highway
Nicoll Underpass	Slip road connecting Sims Way and KPE to Nicoll Highway	Sims Way, Nicoll Highway
Queensway Underpass	Queensway	Commonwealth Avenue
Rifle Range Underpass	Slip road connecting PIE to Jalan Anak Bukit	Pan Island Expressway (PIE)
Sime Underpass	Lornie Road, Kheam Hock Road	Lornie Highway
T4 Underpass	T4 Underpass	Airport Boulevard, T4 Boulevard
Tuas Underpass	Pan Island Expressway (PIE)	Jalan Ahmad Ibrahim, Ayer Rajah Expressway (AYE), Tuas Road, Tuas Flyover
Tuas West Underpass	Ayer Rajah Expressway (AYE)	Tuas West Road
Upper Paya Lebar Underpass	Upper Paya Lebar Road	Bartley Road, Bartley Road East, Bartley Viaduct
Woodleigh Underpass	Bartley Road, Braddell Road	Upper Serangoon Road, Serangoon Viaduct

== List of tunnels ==
Tunnel	Road	Crosses under
Chin Swee Tunnel	Central Expressway (CTE)	Orchard Road, Penang Road, Clemenceau Avenue, Oxley Flyover, River Valley Road, Singapore River, Merchant Road, Havelock Road, Chin Swee Road
Fort Canning Tunnel	Fort Canning Link	Canning Rise, Fort Canning Road
Kampong Java Tunnel	Central Expressway (CTE)	Bukit Timah Road, Cavenagh Road
KPE Tunnel	Kallang-Paya Lebar Expressway (KPE)	Kallang, Geylang, Hougang, Paya Lebar
MCE Tunnel	Marina Coastal Expressway (MCE)	Marina South, Marina Channel, Marina East, Kallang
Sentosa Gateway Tunnel	Sentosa Gateway	Telok Blangah Road, West Coast Highway, Kampong Bahru Road
Woodsville Tunnel	Bendemeer Road, MacPherson Road, Serangoon Road, Upper Serangoon Road	Jalan Kolam Ayer, Jalan Toa Payoh, Pan Island Expressway (PIE), Woodsville Flyover

== See also ==
- List of bridges in Singapore
