= Jalan Buroh =

Name transcription(s)
  - Chinese: 惹兰布罗
  - Malay: Jalan Buruh
- Country: Singapore

Jalan Buroh (Chinese: 惹兰布罗) is a major arterial road in western Singapore. It runs along the industrial areas of Pandan, Tanjong Penjuru and Pioneer.

== Etymology ==
"Buroh" in the old spelling of "Buruh" means "labour" in Malay. As with many Malay roads in Singapore, it still retains the older spelling.

== History ==
The road was built during the era of industrialization in the 60s. A part of the road was originally named "Jalan Kimia" ("Kimia" meaning "chemistry" in Malay), it was renamed to "Jalan Buroh" in 1972. The name was chosen to reflect the industrial nature of the area. Other roads in the area also bare Malay names, including "Jalan Pabrik" (Jurong Port Road), "Jalan Gudang" (Jurong Pier Road), "Jalan Gerabak" (Tractor Road) of which many have been renamed to English by JTC Corporation. Only a handful remain unchanged, including Jalan Papan, Jalan Terusan and Jalan Pesawat. More recently, Jalan Jentera was renamed to Tukang Innovation Drive.

== Today ==
Jalan Buroh today is a major arterial road within the Jurong Industrial Estate. It serves a variety of industrial establishments and facilities including Jurong Port, Jurong Island and Jurong Shipyard.
