= Great World MRT station =

Mass Rapid Transit station in Singapore

Great World TE15 大世界 கிரேட் வோர்ல்ட்
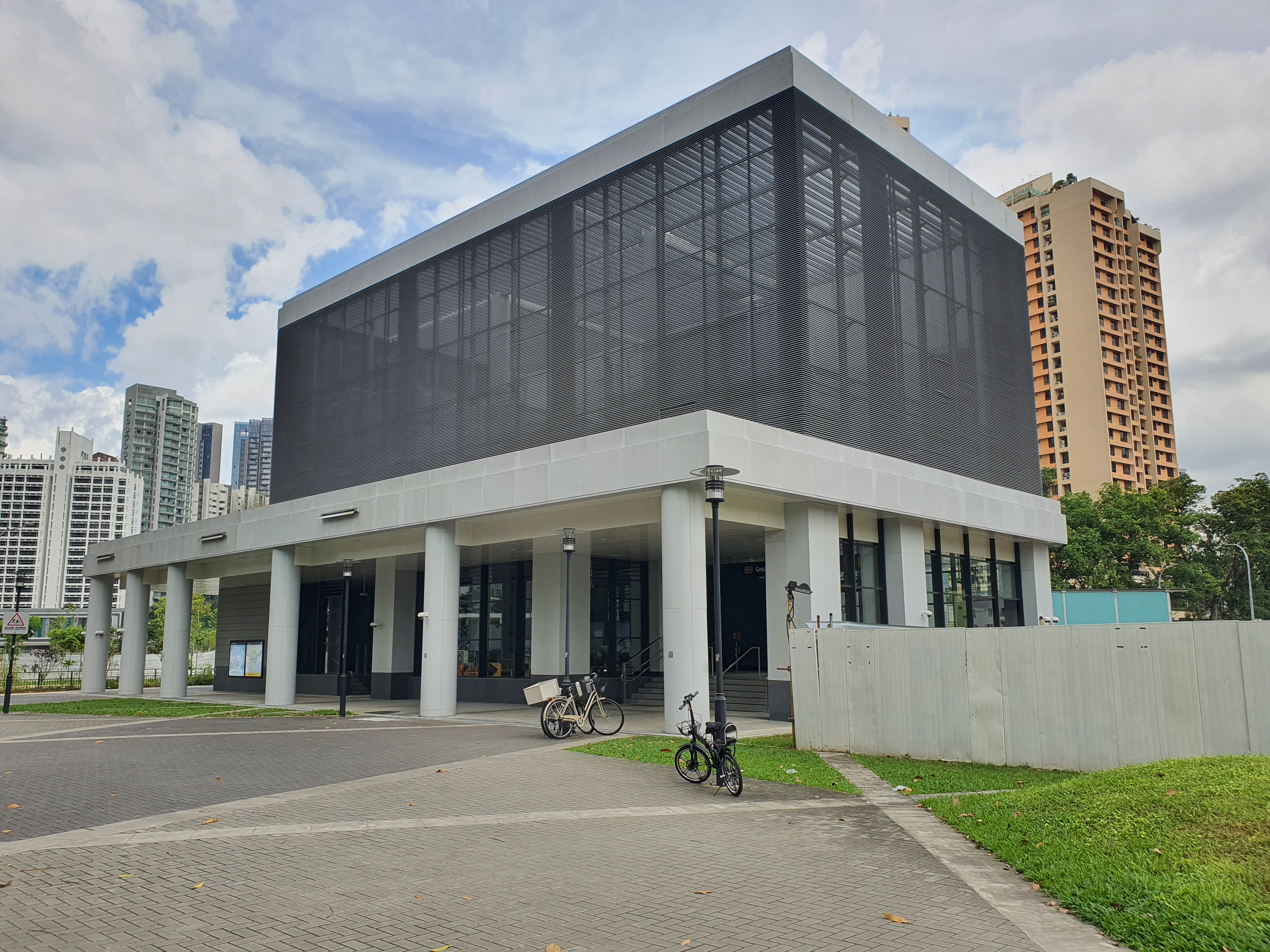
- Exit 1 of Great World MRT station

General information
- Location: 351 River Valley Road, Singapore 238384
- Coordinates: 01°17′42″N 103°50′00″E
- System: Mass Rapid Transit (MRT) station
- Owner: Land Transport Authority
- Operator: SMRT Trains
- Line: Thomson–East Coast Line
- Platforms: 2 (1 island platform)
- Tracks: 2
- Connections: Bus, Taxi

Construction
- Structure type: Underground
- Platform levels: 1
- Parking: Yes (Great World)
- Accessible: Yes

Other information
- Station code: GRW

History
- Opened: 13 November 2022; 4 years ago
- Former names: Kim Seng, River Valley

Passengers
- June 2024: 6,810 per day

Services
Preceding station	Mass Rapid Transit	Following station
Orchard towards Woodlands North	Thomson–East Coast Line	Havelock towards Bayshore
Track layout
Location
- Location within Singapore Rail central area

Great World MRT station is an underground Mass Rapid Transit (MRT) station on the Thomson–East Coast Line (TEL). Located in River Valley, Singapore, the station is near the Great World shopping mall and surrounding residential developments. The station is operated by SMRT Trains.

First announced in August 2012 as part of the Thomson Line (TSL), the station was constructed as part of TEL Phase 3 (TEL 3) with the merger of the TSL and the Eastern Region Line. The station opened on 13 November 2022 with only two out of five entrances completed due to construction difficulties at the site. Great World station features an Art-in-Transit artwork Great World, Great Times by Deanna Ng.

== History ==
Construction progress of the station

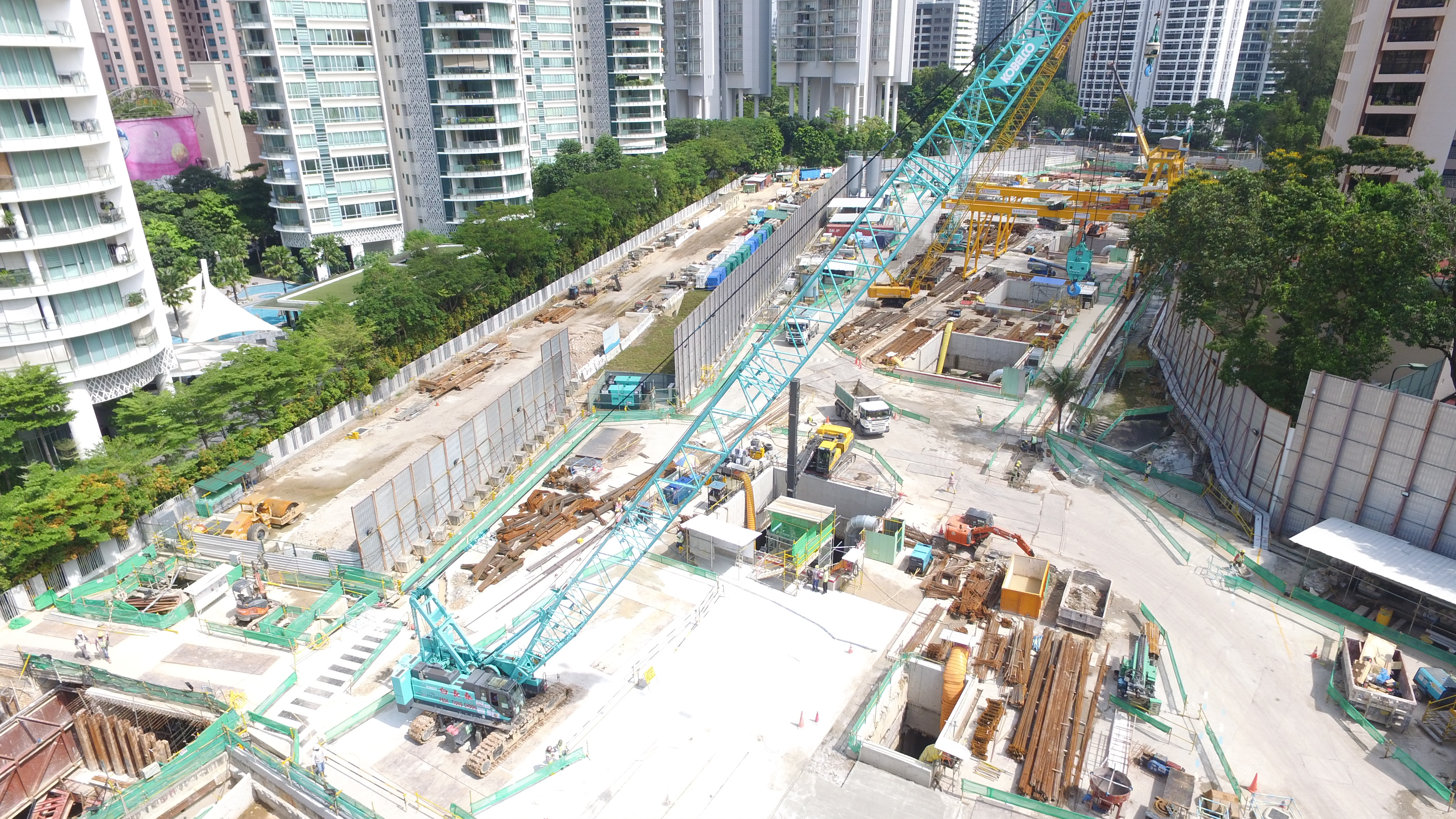
Station site in April 2017

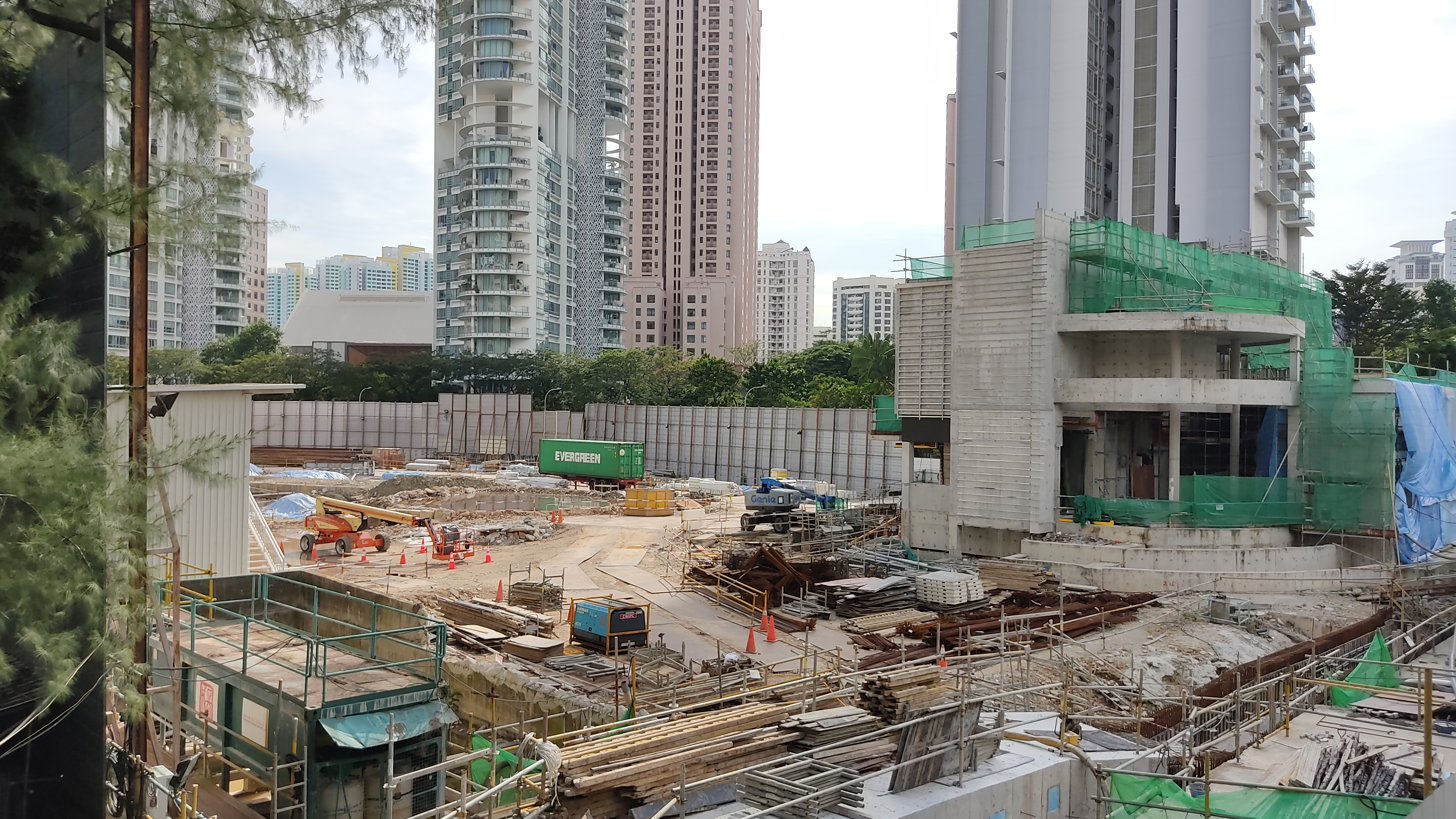
Great World MRT station Exit 4 under construction in November 2020

The station was first announced on 29 August 2012 as part of the Thomson line (TSL). The contract for the design and construction of the station and associated tunnels was awarded to a joint venture between Tiong Seng Contractors and Dongah Geological Engineering (Singapore branch) for S$316 million (US$235.8 million) in May 2014. Construction started in 2014, with an expected completion date in 2021.

On 15 August 2014, the Land Transport Authority (LTA) announced that TSL would merge with the Eastern Region line to form the Thomson–East Coast line (TEL). Great World station was constructed as part of Phase 3, consisting of 13 stations between the Mount Pleasant and Gardens by the Bay stations.

On the morning of 11 June 2015, residents of Bukit Merah, Outram, Tanjong Pagar and Tiong Bahru were affected by an Internet outage. A section of fibre optic cables was damaged during the station's construction. The disruption lasted more than eight hours and affected all the major Internet service providers in Singapore. The LTA issued an apology for the disruption. On 19 December 2015, a Bangladeshi construction worker guiding an excavator was killed when the excavator's bucket dislodged and fell on him. He was taken to Singapore General Hospital but was pronounced dead on arrival.

With restrictions imposed on construction due to the COVID-19 pandemic, the TEL3 completion date was pushed by a year to 2022. On 9 March 2022, Transport Minister S. Iswaran announced in Parliament that TEL3 would open in the second half of that year. As confirmed during a visit by Iswaran at the Outram Park and Maxwell stations on 7 October 2022, the station began operations on 13 November.

Due to the presence of multiple steel beams and plates underground initially absent from historical records, contractors have to use the cut-and-cover method alongside micro tunnel boring to construct the Kim Seng underpass. The additional cut-and-cover works, including diverting traffic, delayed the opening of the other station entrances. The other entrances were expected to be completed by 2023, but were only opened in 2025.

== Description ==
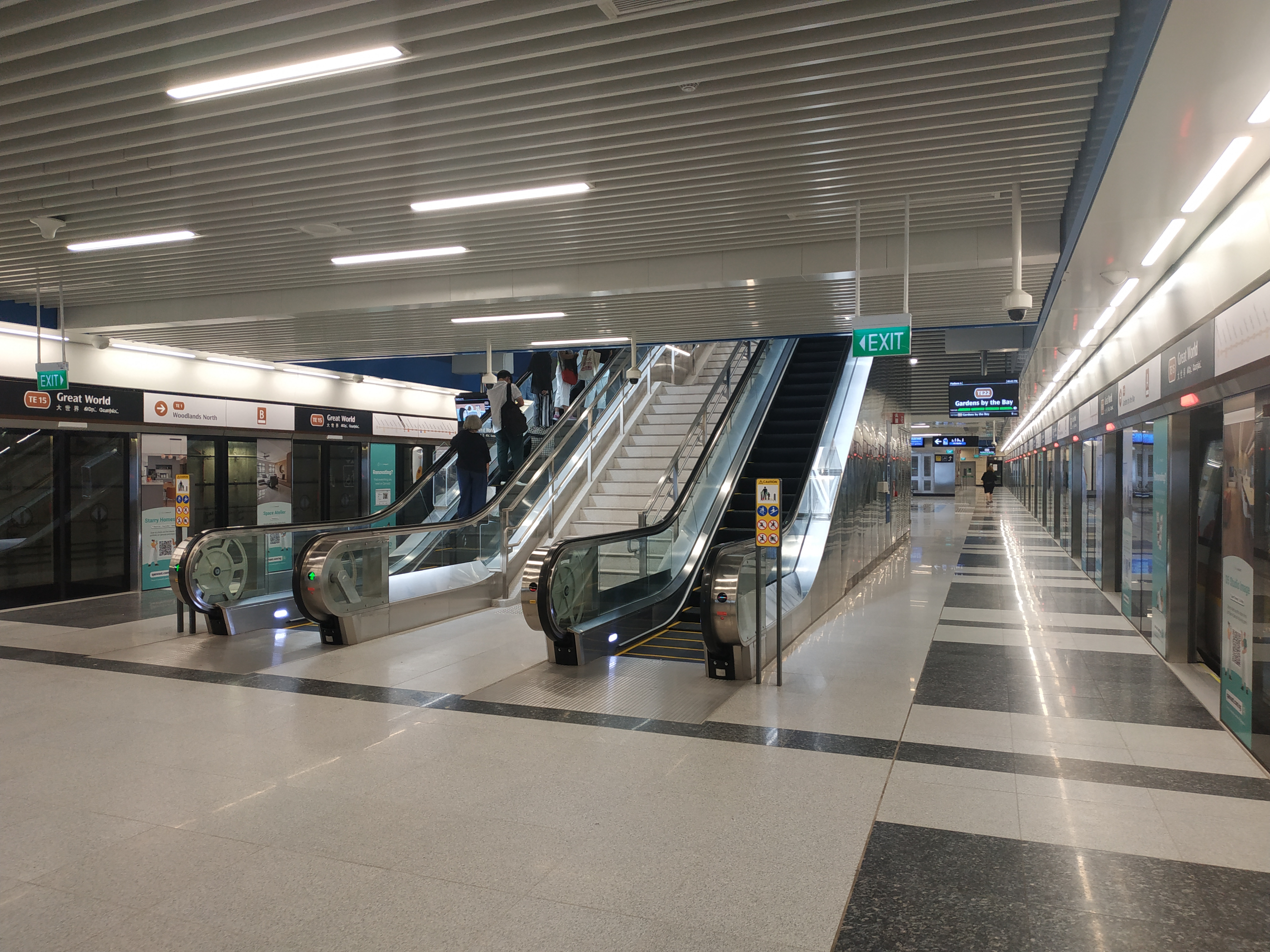
Platform level of Great World station

Great World station serves the TEL and is between the Orchard and Havelock stations. The official station code is TE15. Being part of the TEL, the station is operated by SMRT Trains. Train frequencies on the TEL range from 3 to 6 minutes. The station is 176.77 metres (580.0 ft) long with a depth of 21 metres (69 ft).

The station is near the eponymous Great World City, connected via three entrances. Situated along River Valley Green, the station serves various residential developments including Grand Copthorne Waterfront, Riva Lodge, River Green, Promenade Peak and The Trillium. It also serves River Valley Primary School and Church of St. Bernadette.

Great World, Great Times by Deanna Ng is displayed at this station as part of the Art-in-Transit programme, a showcase of public artworks on the MRT network. The collage of advertisements, which includes old movie posters, reflects an era of the 70s when the Great World Amusement Park was still operating. Many of the advertisements were recreated using modern-day participants such as a choral troupe for cabaret girls, while the movie poster was reproduced with permission from The Shaw Organisation. Also included is Ng's parents' wedding photo taken near Great World Amusement Park, which inspired the artwork.
