= Great World, Singapore =

Great World
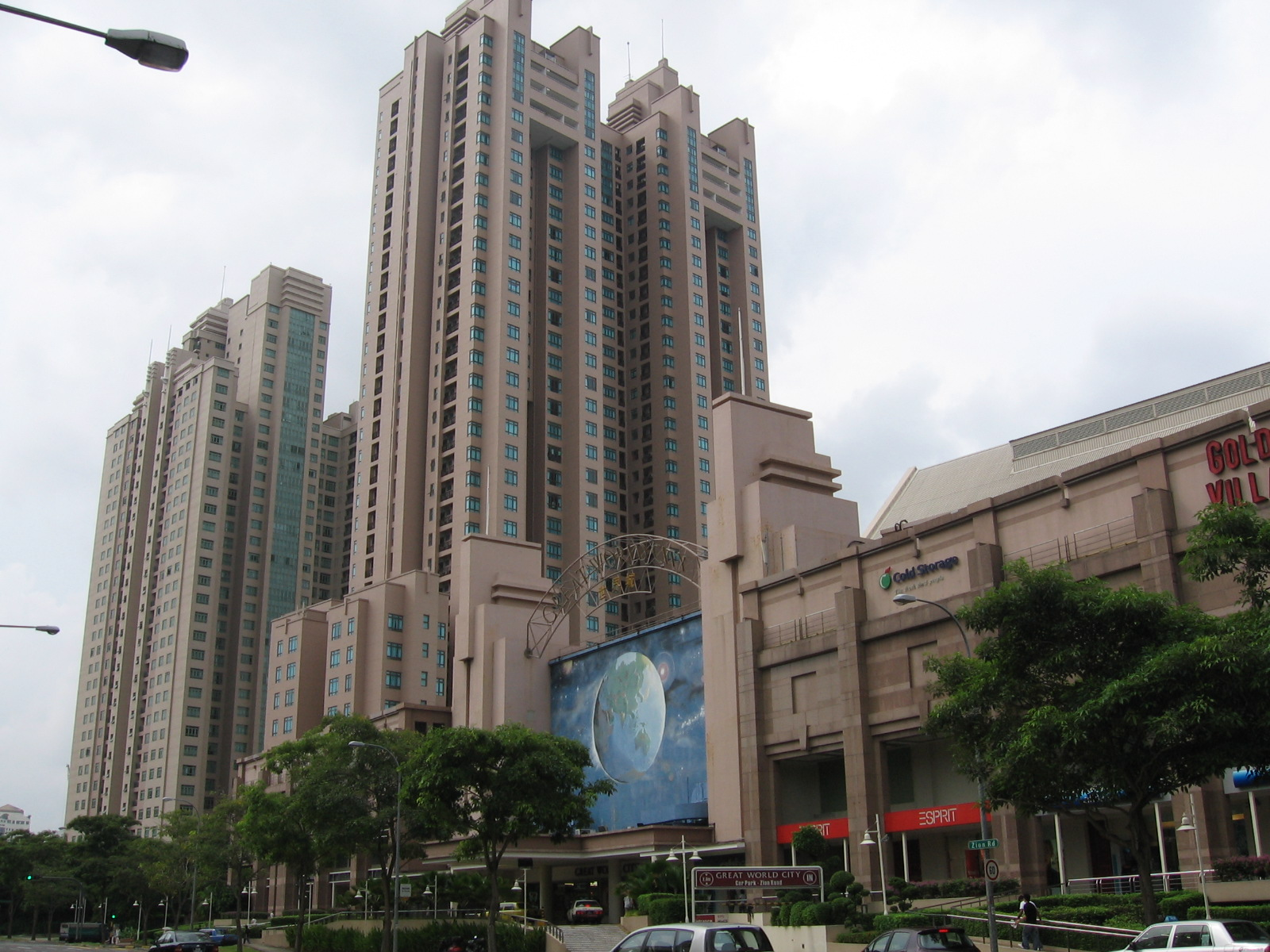
- Great World City in 2006, prior to renovation
- Location: Singapore
- Coordinates: 1°17′37″N 103°49′55″E
- Address: 1 Kim Seng Promenade
- Opened: October 16, 1997; 29 years ago (Soft opening); November 28, 1997; 28 years ago (Official opening)
- Manager: Allgreen Properties Ltd
- Owner: GWC Commercial Pte. Ltd. (A wholly owned subsidiary of Allgreen Properties Ltd)
- Num. of stores: 146
- Num. of anchor tenants: 7
- Floor area: 555,514 square feet (51,608.9 m^{2})
- Floors: 6
- Public transit: TE15 Great World
- Website: shop.greatworld.com.sg

Great World, formerly known as Great World City, is a mixed-used development consisting of a 6-storey shopping mall, two 18-storey office towers and a 35-storey serviced apartment tower in the Central Area of Singapore. Located between Kim Seng and Zion Roads, near River Valley Road and Kim Seng Promenade, it was built on the former site of Great World Amusement Park.

The East Office Tower of Great World houses the Embassy of Kazakhstan on the 9th floor of the building.

== History ==
Great World City was completed in October 1997 as a redevelopment of the former Great World Amusement Park. When it first opened, it had an OG department store (closed in 2003), a Golden Village cinema, a Food Junction food court, a Cold Storage supermarket and more than 130 specialty shops. The Golden Village cinema was the first to include a short-lived IMAX hall and Singapore's first premium cinema concept, Gold Class.

=== Renovation ===
In 2018, the mall underwent its first major renovation works in preparation for the opening of Great World MRT station and new developments in the vicinity, which were completed and officially reopened in late 2020. The renovation works include reconfiguring the interior layout, such as having "dual level retail pods" in one of its atriums, and widening the walkways to improve accessibility.

Food Junction was relocated to Level 3, taking up a portion of Amazonia's former space. Amazonia, an indoor playground for kids, also revamped during this period and reopened in Dec 2019. Japanese supermarket chain Meidi-Ya opened in Basement 2, to complement the existing Cold Storage supermarket in 2019. The mall remained open throughout the renovation works. Rubi Shoes opened in April 2019 at Great World and was closed down in November 2021 due to poor sales, being replaced by Cotton On Body temporarily and Bath & Body Works.

Great World MRT station opened on 13 November 2022, giving the mall close access to an MRT station.

== See also ==
- List of shopping malls in Singapore
- List of restaurants in Singapore
