= Havelock MRT station =

Mass Rapid Transit station in Singapore

Havelock TE16 合乐 ஹவ்லாக்
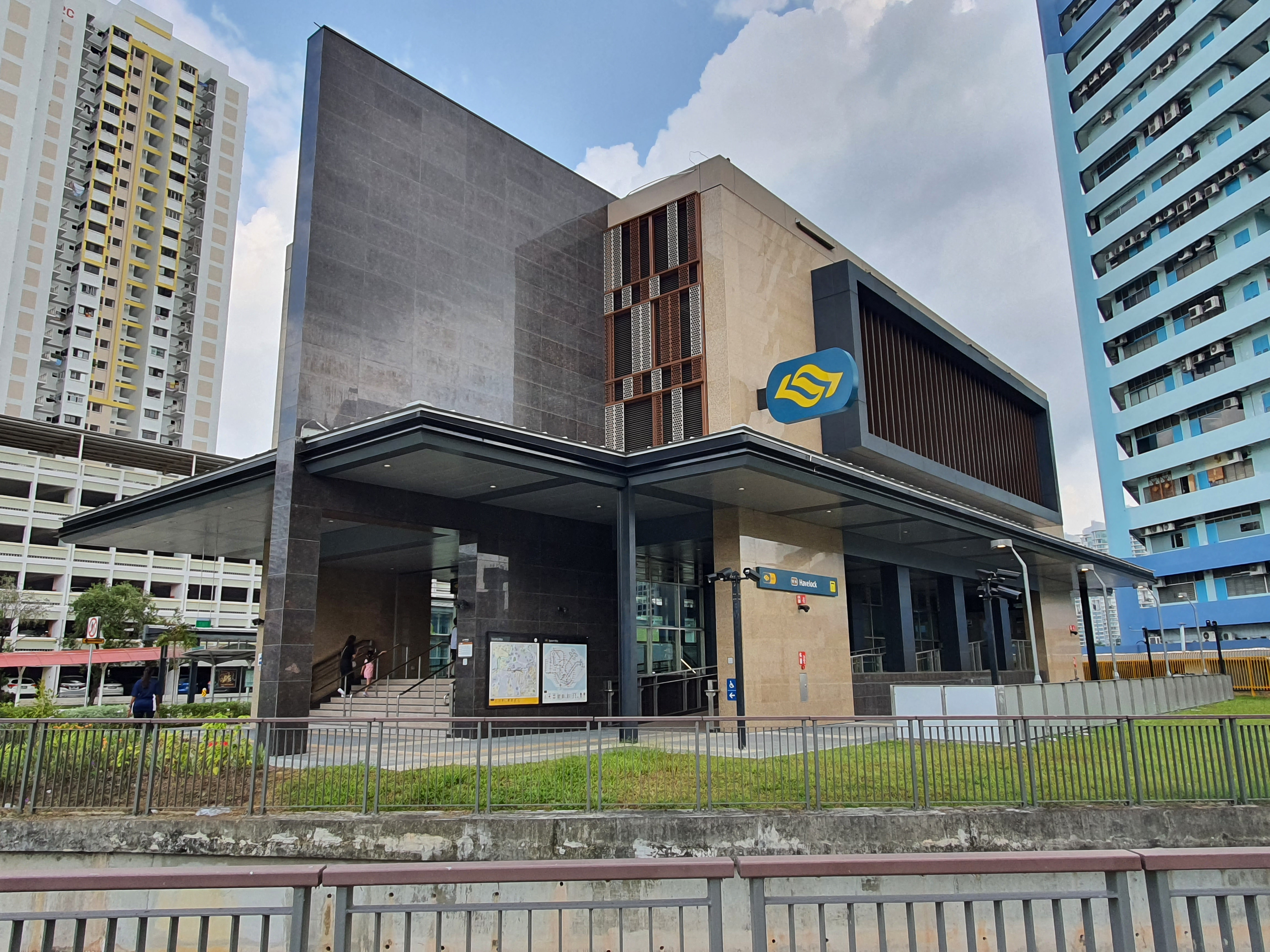
- Exit 1 of the station

General information
- Location: 110 Zion Road, Singapore 168604
- Coordinates: 01°17′16″N 103°50′01″E
- System: Mass Rapid Transit (MRT) station
- Owner: Land Transport Authority
- Operator: SMRT Trains
- Line: Thomson–East Coast Line
- Platforms: 2 (1 island platform)
- Tracks: 2
- Connections: Bus, Taxi

Construction
- Structure type: Underground
- Platform levels: 1
- Cycle facilities: Yes
- Accessible: Yes
- Architect: SAA Architects

Other information
- Station code: HVL

History
- Opened: 13 November 2022; 3 years ago

Services
| Preceding station | Mass Rapid Transit | Following station |
|---|---|---|
| Great World towards Woodlands North | Thomson–East Coast Line | Outram Park towards Bayshore |
Track layout
Location
- Location within Singapore Rail central area

Havelock MRT station is an underground Mass Rapid Transit station on the Thomson–East Coast Line (TEL) in Bukit Merah, Singapore. Located near the Bukit Ho Swee area, the station runs along Zion Road and serves nearby landmarks such as the Tan Boon Liat Building and Giok Hong Tian Temple.

First announced in August 2012 as part of the abolished Thomson Line (TSL), the station became part of TEL Stage 3 (TEL3) following the merger of the TSL and the Eastern Region Line in 2014. Construction began by 2015, with an expected completion date of 2021; due to the COVID-19 pandemic, the opening date was delayed to 2022. Havelock station opened on 13 November 2022. Havelock Traces, an artwork comprising fragments of former buildings along Havelock Road, is displayed at this station as part of the Art-in-Transit programme.

== History ==
The Thomson Line (TSL) was announced by then-transport minister Raymond Lim in January 2008 to reduce passenger congestion on the Mass Rapid Transit (MRT) system. The final alignment of the TSL was announced in August 2012 by the Land Transport Authority (LTA), which included Havelock station. The contract for the construction of Havelock station, Contract T221, was awarded to Gammon Construction Limited in February 2014, at S$210 million (equivalent to S$229,000,000 in 2026). The TSL was later merged with the Eastern Region Line to form the Thomson–East Coast Line (TEL) in August 2014.

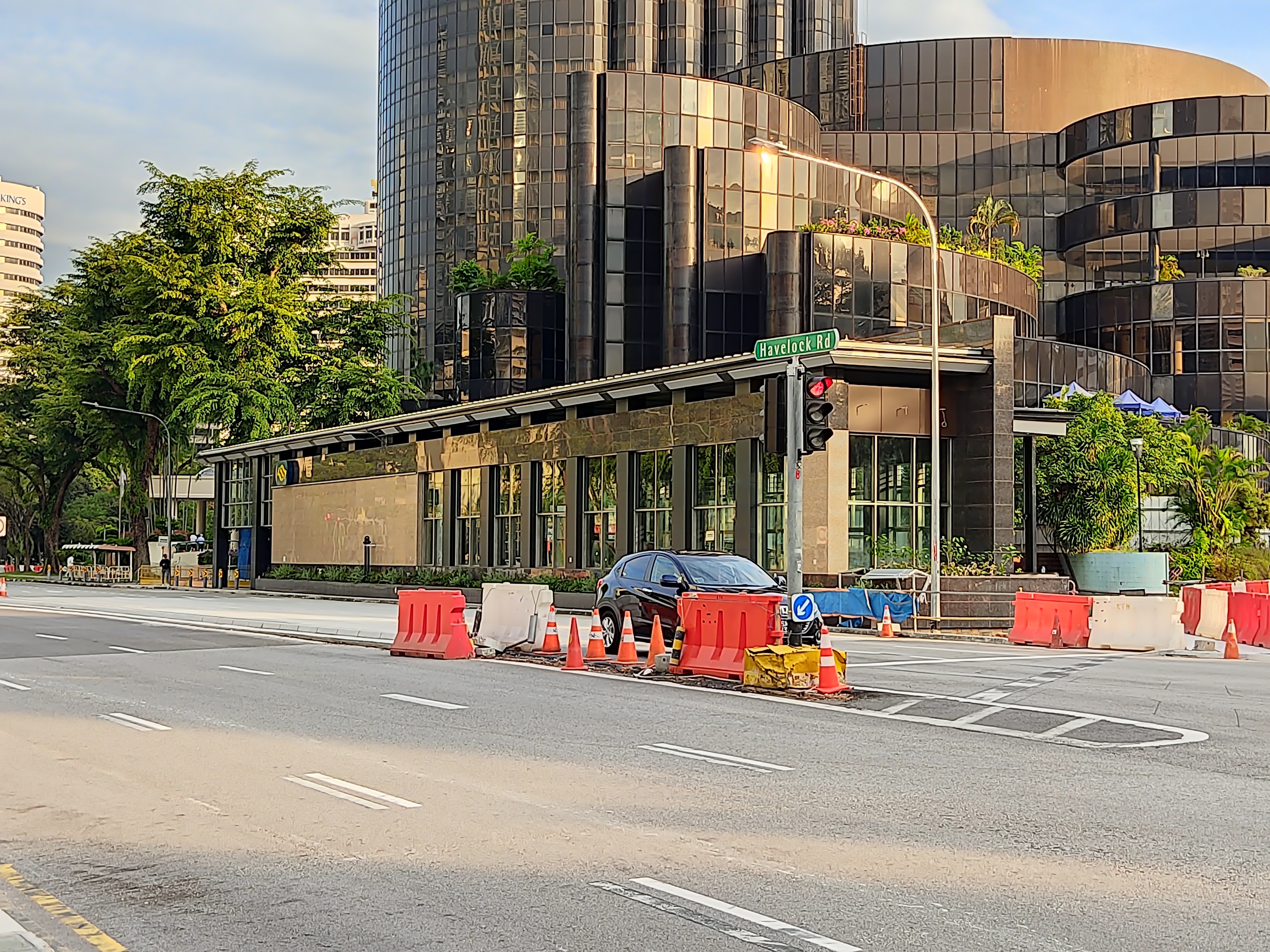
View of one of the station’s entrances under construction

Construction for Havelock and five other stations began in March 2015, delayed from the first quarter of 2014, with an expected completion date of 2021. Havelock was constructed as part of TEL Stage 3 (TEL3), which consisted of 13 stations between Mount Pleasant and Gardens by the Bay. In January 2022, a sheltered staircase was completed as part of Entrance Three following consultations to the residents and Josephine Teo. The construction of the station also saw Singapore's first use of a rectangular tunnel boring machine (TBM), a TBM that digs rectangular tunnels. The machine was used for a 150 m (490 ft) underpass. According to the LTA, it was less disruptive and saved time and labour compared to the traditional cut-and-cover method.

Due to the COVID-19 pandemic disrupting the supply of material and manpower, then-transport minister Ong Ye Kung wrote to Member of Parliament Ang Wei Neng in May 2021 that the completion of TEL3, among two other stages, had been pushed to a range between 2022 and 2025. Subsequent transport minister S. Iswaran later announced to Parliament that TEL3 would open in the second half of 2022. As confirmed during a TEL3 visit by Iswaran in October 2022, Havelock station began operations on 13 November 2022; a preview of the station took place two days prior.

== Details ==
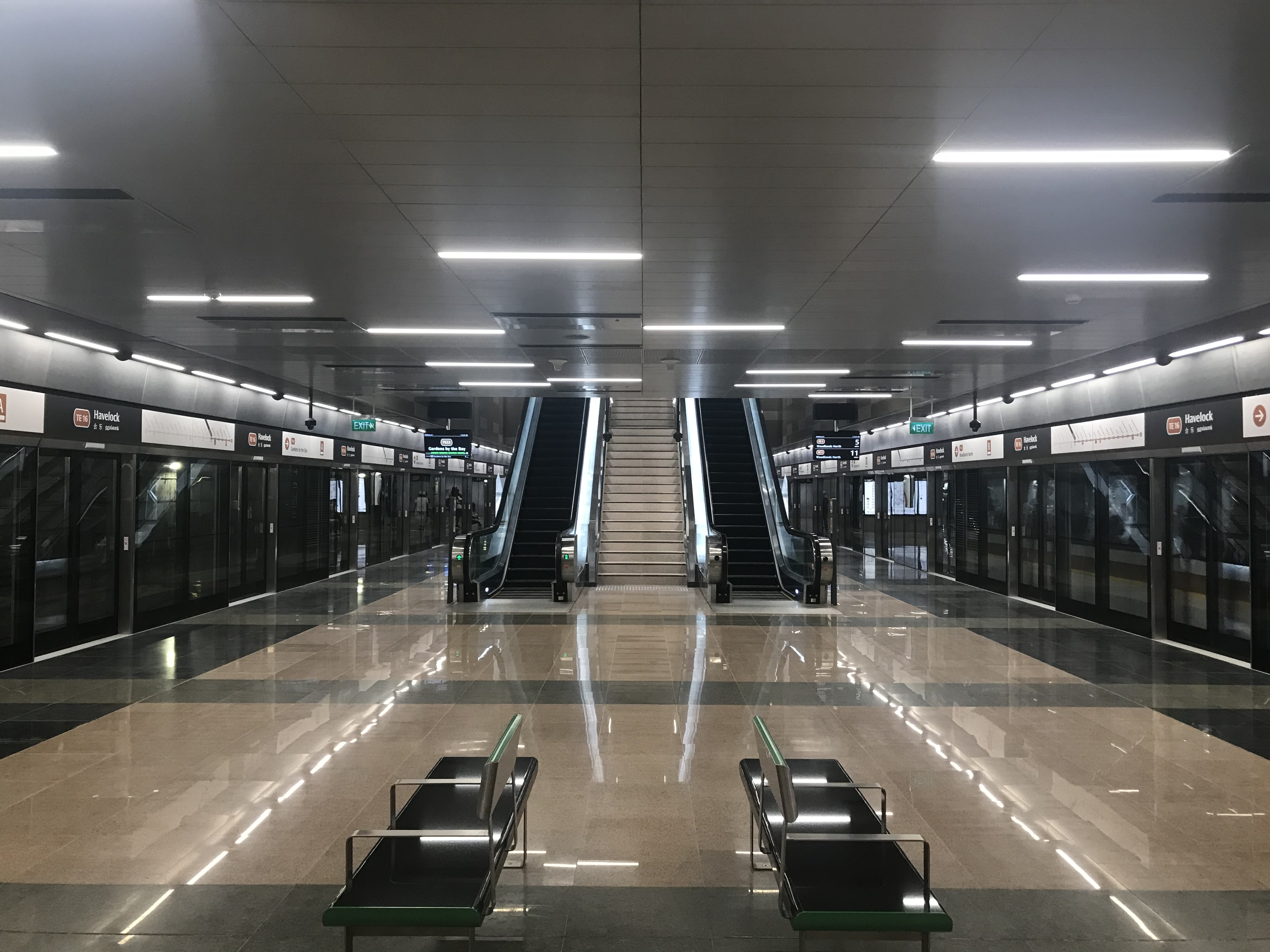
Station platform

Havelock station serves the TEL and is between the Great World and Outram Park stations, with the official station code of TE16. As part of the TEL, it is operated by SMRT. Train frequencies on the TEL range from 3 minutes to an average of 6 minutes. The station is wheelchair-accessible and has bicycle facilities.

External media
- Artist's impression of Havelock station
- Location map of Havelock station

Located around Zion Road, the station has five exits serving nearby landmarks such as the Tan Boon Liat Building, Concorde Shopping Centre, Giok Hong Tian Temple, Grand Copthorne Waterfront Hotel, and Zion Sports Corner. Havelock also serves the residential area of Bukit Ho Swee.

Havelock Traces, created by an anonymous artist, is displayed at this station as part of the Art-in-Transit programme, a showcase of public artworks on the MRT network. The artwork, which showcases fragments of former buildings along Havelock Road, aims to "offer a glimpse into town planning in pre-independence Singapore and how it affected the way [Singaporeans] lived and worked".
