= Kim Seng Bridge =

- Coordinates: 1°17′34″N 103°49′52″E
- Carries: Kim Seng Road
- Crosses: Singapore River
- Locale: Central Region
- Named for: Tan Kim Seng

Characteristics
- Material: Prestressed concrete, steel
- Total length: 26 m (85 ft)
- Width: 20 m (66 ft)

History
- Opened: 1951

Location
- Interactive map of Kim Seng Bridge

Kim Seng Bridge is a road bridge in Singapore River, Singapore. The bridge is named after Tan Kim Seng, who was a Singaporean businessman and philanthropist from the Peranakan ethnic group. It marks the start of the Singapore River to its mouth.

Colloquially, Kim Seng Bridge is also known as Hong Hin Kio (丰 兴 桥) in Hokkien and Fung Heng Lo (also 丰 兴 桥) in Cantonese.

In 1862, Tan Kim Seng erected the first bridge on the site of today's bridge, which was named after him. It was replaced in 1890 by a new bridge.

Due to increased traffic on the bridge, a new bridge was built on the original site by contractors Ewart and Company in 1951 with a budget of $370,000. The new bridge consisted of prestressed concrete and steel. The new bridge is 20 m wide (twice as much as the predecessor bridges) and 26 m long and can carry up to 13 tonnes of weight per m^{2}.
