= Great World Amusement Park =

Defunct amusement park

Great World Amusement Park (大世界)
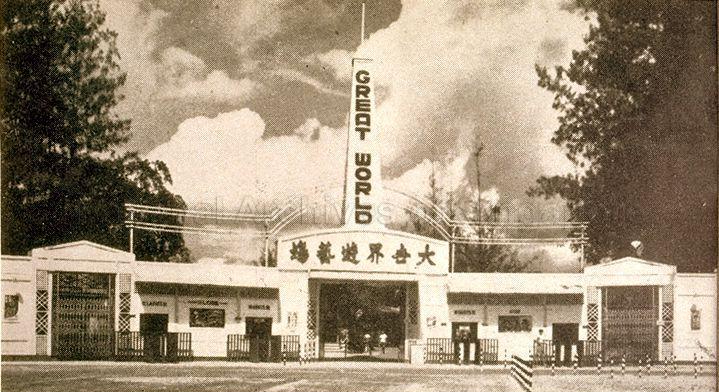
- Great World Amusement Park circa 1950
- Interactive map of Great World Amusement Park (大世界)
- Location: Kim Seng Promenande, Singapore
- Coordinates: 1°17′37″N 103°49′55″E
- Status: Defunct
- Opened: 1929; 97 years ago
- Closed: 1978; 48 years ago
- Owner: Shaw Organisation

The Great World Amusement Park (Chinese: 大世界) also known locally as "Tua Seh Kai" (Pe̍h-ōe-jī: tōa sè-kài) in Hokkien, was the second of three former amusement parks in Singapore, along with New World (established 1923) and Gay World (established 1936). It was established in 1929 and closed down in 1978. It provided entertainment and leisure to people, catering especially to the middle and lower income groups of citizens in the past.

== History ==
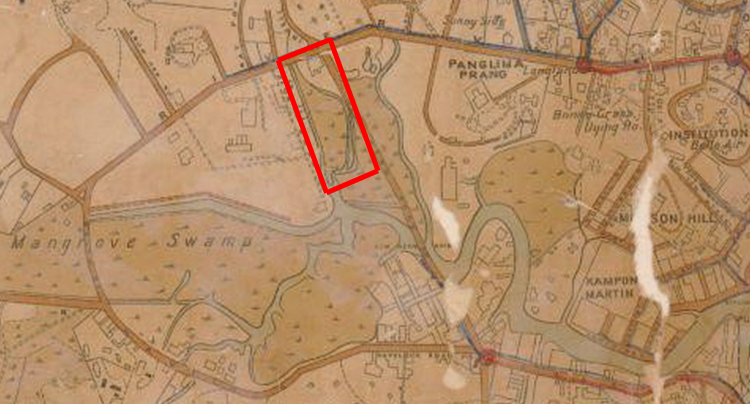
Great World Amusement Park on a map of Singapore, 1909.

The amusement park was situated between Zion Road, River Valley Road and Kim Seng Road in the central part of Singapore. In the 1920s, the site was originally a Chinese cemetery. Taking reference to a map of Singapore in 1909, the place was covered with swampy marshes back then and a small canal run across the site, eventually meeting with the Singapore River thereafter. The landowner, Lee Geok Kun (brother of philanthropist Lee Kong Chian), redeveloped the site into an amusement park in the 1930s. Business within Great World did not fulfil the expectations of the owners so in 1941, the park was sold to the Shaw Brothers who took over the operations of the park.

=== Japanese occupation ===
Before the Shaw Brothers could make any interventions to their newly acquired park, the Japanese took control over Singapore during the second World War. The park was then converted into a Prisoner-Of-War (POW) camp that held captive the Australian soldiers from the Allied Forces. Eventually the park was instructed to resume its activities for the benefit of the Japanese soldiers. In order to make way for these activities, the POWs were shifted into shacks that were behind the park, out of access and sight from the park. Gambling activities, a favourite amongst the Japanese, were rampant in the park during this period.

=== After World War II ===
Following the war, Great World was given a makeover with most of its attractions as well as stalls revamped and upgraded. In 1958, the park had a grand opening here and Elizabeth Taylor, a famous actress back then, graced the event as she was performing at Sky Theatre's opening as well. It was a major talking point back then as many came down especially just to catch a glimpse of the actress in person. International Trade Fairs were also held within the park and it would fetch a record high attendance of 50,000 visitors. Some other events that were held there include the British Trade Fair, badminton matches, and even boxing matches. There was also a Japanese Circus there. There were a vast array of game stalls and shops in Great World as well, such as selling toys and children's clothes.

The park attractions included four Shaw Brothers-run cinemas named Atlantic, Canton, Globe and Sky, a nightclub called Flamingo. Globe and Sky Theatres showcased mainly English films while Atlantic and Canton Theatres screened their films in either mandarin or cantonese. Films were second-run films thus they were available at an affordable price of 50cents per ticket. The Flamingo Night Club was also a common hang out spot among the wealthy individuals, paying homage to the group of cabaret girls home to the night club.

Famous restaurants and food stalls were not to be missed such as the famous Cantonese restaurant Wing Choon Yuen (now Spring Court) and Diamond, famous for its specialities like Sharks' fin and roasted pork, was a common spot for wedding banquets and functions. A handful of park attractions like the ferris wheel, carousel, and roller coaster rides were popular especially by the young kids. Peking Operas and wayang shows were popular amongst the older generation and they are shown on the stage there. There is the popular Ghost Train, which took one for a ride full and screams and shouts with the ghost and demons props hanging down along the journey inside a building.

=== 1960s ===
As television gained popularity here from the 1960s onwards, people visited the park less thus business started to decline. Finally, the park had its last session opened to the people in 1964 and was subsequently sold off to Kuok Holdings in 1978. A retail shopping mall, Great World City (now Great World) which includes residential and office spaces now sits on the very spot where Great World Amusement Park used to stand.

== Architecture and design ==
The developers saw fit to retain a similar concept of the "Worlds" and introduce it to the new development. Different themes, like African, Spanish, Egyptian and the Wild West, were implemented inside the toilets, accompanied with ornamentations around the mall. Even the ceiling board was painted sky blue to portray the idea of visitors entering a "World" of its own. The thematic approach was met with praise and criticism, with members of the younger generation lauding the convenience brought by the mall, while older visitors lamented that these thematic facades do not do justice to the rich history of Great World Amusement Park. Only a slight resemblance could be made in the facade leading to the entrance of the shopping centre.

== In popular culture ==
In 2010, director Kelvin Tong produced a film revolving around the amusement park. The two-million dollar film, It's A Great, Great World, based on the history of the park, was released theatrically on 27 January 2011, throughout Singapore.

== See also ==
- Great World of Shanghai.
