= Alexandra Canal =

Alexandra Canal may refer to:

- Alexandra Canal (New South Wales), in Sydney, New South Wales, Australia
- Alexandra Canal, Singapore; see List of rivers of Singapore
