= Jubilee Bridge, Singapore =

Bridge in Singapore

Jubilee Bridge Jambatan Jubli 金禧桥 பொன்விழாப் பாலம்
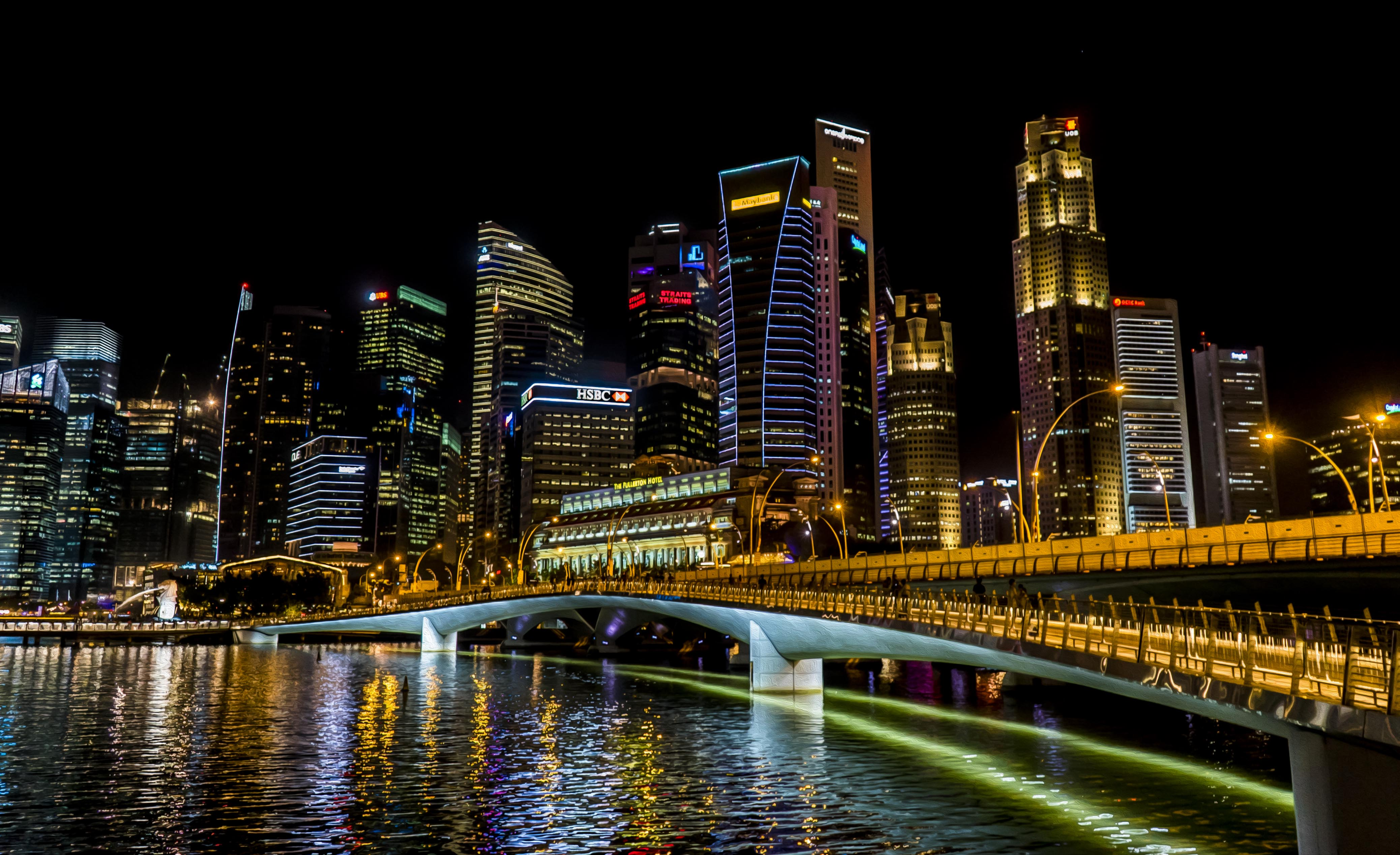
- Coordinates: 1°17′17″N 103°51′16″E
- Carries: Pedestrians
- Crosses: Singapore River
- Locale: Downtown Core, Singapore
- Official name: Jubilee Bridge

Characteristics
- Design: Balanced cantilever bridge
- Total length: 220m
- Width: 6m
- Longest span: 95m

History
- Architect: Cox Architects (Sydney) architects61 (Singapore)
- Designer: ARUP Pte Ltd
- Constructed by: Marina Technology & Construction Pte Ltd
- Opened: 29 March 2015; 11 years ago

Location
- Interactive map of Jubilee Bridge

Jubilee Bridge is a pedestrian bridge spanning the Singapore River, connecting Merlion Park and The Esplanade. The construction of the bridge was suggested by then Prime Minister Lee Kuan Yew. It was opened ahead of schedule due to his death.

== History ==
In 2004, while visiting Marina Bay, then Prime Minister Lee Kuan Yew realised that pedestrians had to walk to Esplanade Bridge to cross the Singapore River, which he believed to be too narrow. Due to this, Jubilee Bridge was designed to run along Esplanade Bridge at a lower and more pedestrian-friendly level. Plans for the bridge were first announced in 2009, and construction began in 2012. The bridge cost $17.7 million and 28 months to build. The bridge was to open in April 2015, but it was unofficially opened on 29 March following the death of Lee Kuan Yew as a final farewell. The bridge was opened by Prime Minister Lee Hsien Loong as part of the Golden Jubilee Celebrations in 2015.

The bridge was included in the New Paper Big Walk in 2015.
