= The New Paper =

Singaporean newspaper

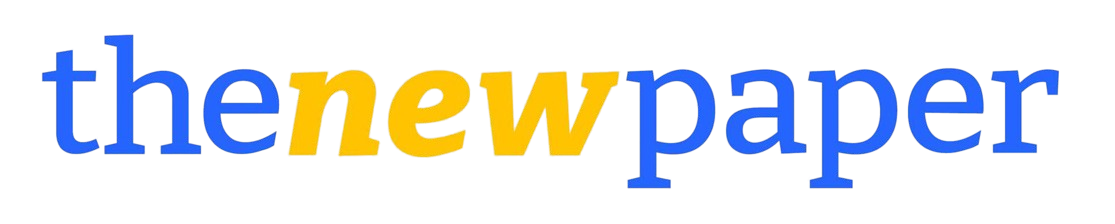

- Homepage of The New Paper website on 18 May 2025
- Type: Daily newspaper
- Format: Digital
- Editor: Lim Han Ming
- Founded: 26 July 1988; 38 years ago (13,994 issues)
- Ceased publication: 30 October 2025; 12 months ago (merged into STOMP)
- Language: English
- Headquarters: Singapore
- Circulation: Target 300,000 daily
- OCLC number: 224529521
- Website: tnp.straitstimes.com

The New Paper is a Singaporean newspaper. It was originally published in tabloid format as a "noon paper", then from 2016 as a freesheet in the morning from 7 a.m. onwards. In December 2021 the paper became digital only. On 30 October 2025, The New Paper merged with STOMP and published its last article on the same day.

== History ==
First launched on 26 July 1988 by Singapore Press Holdings (SPH), it had an average daily circulation of 101,600 in August 2010, according to SPH.

In 1991, the paper organised the New Paper Big Walk, a mass-participation walking event. The event came to be held annually. It holds the Guinness World Record for the world's largest walk, which it earned for having 77,500 participants on 21 May 2000.

There is also a noon edition that hits the newsstands on Mondays and Thursdays that gives more special coverage of late-night association football matches that occur after the morning edition goes to press. The New Paper was Singapore's second-highest circulating paid English-language newspaper before it became a free newspaper on 1 December 2016.

The New Paper is noted for its coverage of sports news, particularly of association football (e.g. the UEFA Champions League and the Premier League). Amongst its sports journalists, Iain Macintosh was voted second runner-up for Best Football Journalist held by Soccerlens.com website in 2010.

On 15 June 1993, in partnership with distributor Lityan Systems, both parties launched a one-step video programmer, to help readers key in the four-digit codes assigned for the programmes listed in the television guides published in The New Paper. The device cost $125.

FiRST which was originally published as a monthly magazine, merged with The New Paper in May 2009, and was published as a weekly pull-out rather than monthly.

The New Paper is often compared to the tabloid Today, although the latter positions itself against The Straits Times. The New Paper targets readers with more eye-catching tabloid journalism featuring sensationalist headlines. It tends to focus on local human-interest stories, with extensive sections on entertainment, fashion and sports. There is, in comparison with The Straits Times, very little coverage of international news. However, according to SPH, The New Paper presents "news with sharp angles not seen elsewhere". SPU calls the paper "stylish", "arresting" and "easy to read" while tackling "complex issues".

The newspaper's average daily sales had dropped to 60,000, according to Warren Fernandez, Editor-in-Chief of the English/Malay/Tamil Media group of SPH, before it became a freesheet.

On 17 October 2016, Singapore Press Holdings announced a 10% cut of staff, and that My Paper and The New Paper (TNP) would be merged to form a revamped TNP that will be a freesheet on 1 December 2016. Distributed free of charge, this version of The New Paper aimed to reach a circulation of 300,000, matching Today, the other English-language free newspaper in Singapore.

On 10 December 2021, The New Paper ceased its print edition and went fully digital.

On 30 October 2025, The New Paper merged with STOMP and published its last article on the same day.

== See also ==
- List of newspapers in Singapore
- List of newspapers
