= Read Bridge =

Bridge in Clarke Quay, Singapore

Coordinates: 1°17′21″N 103°50′42.1″E

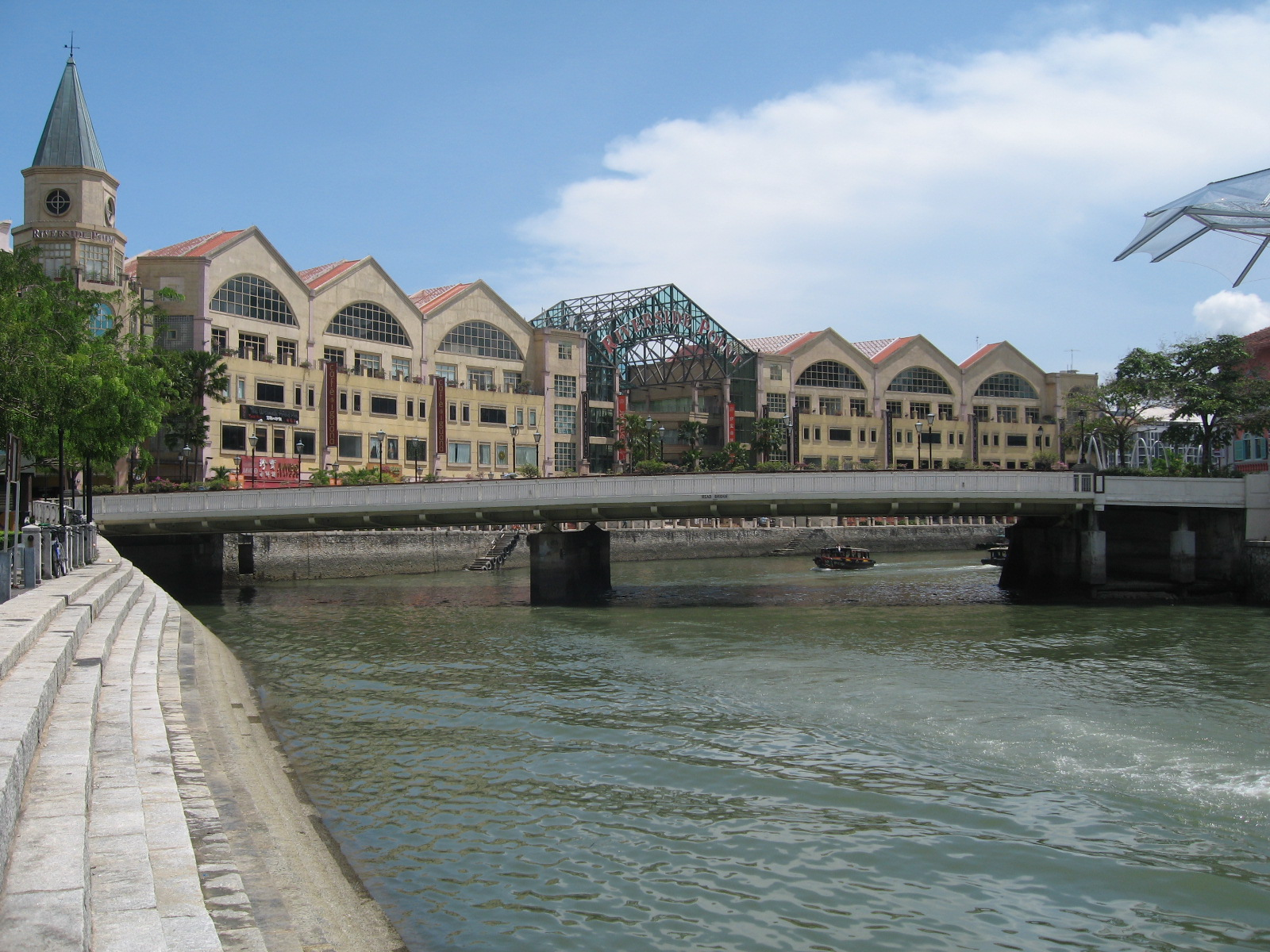
Read Bridge

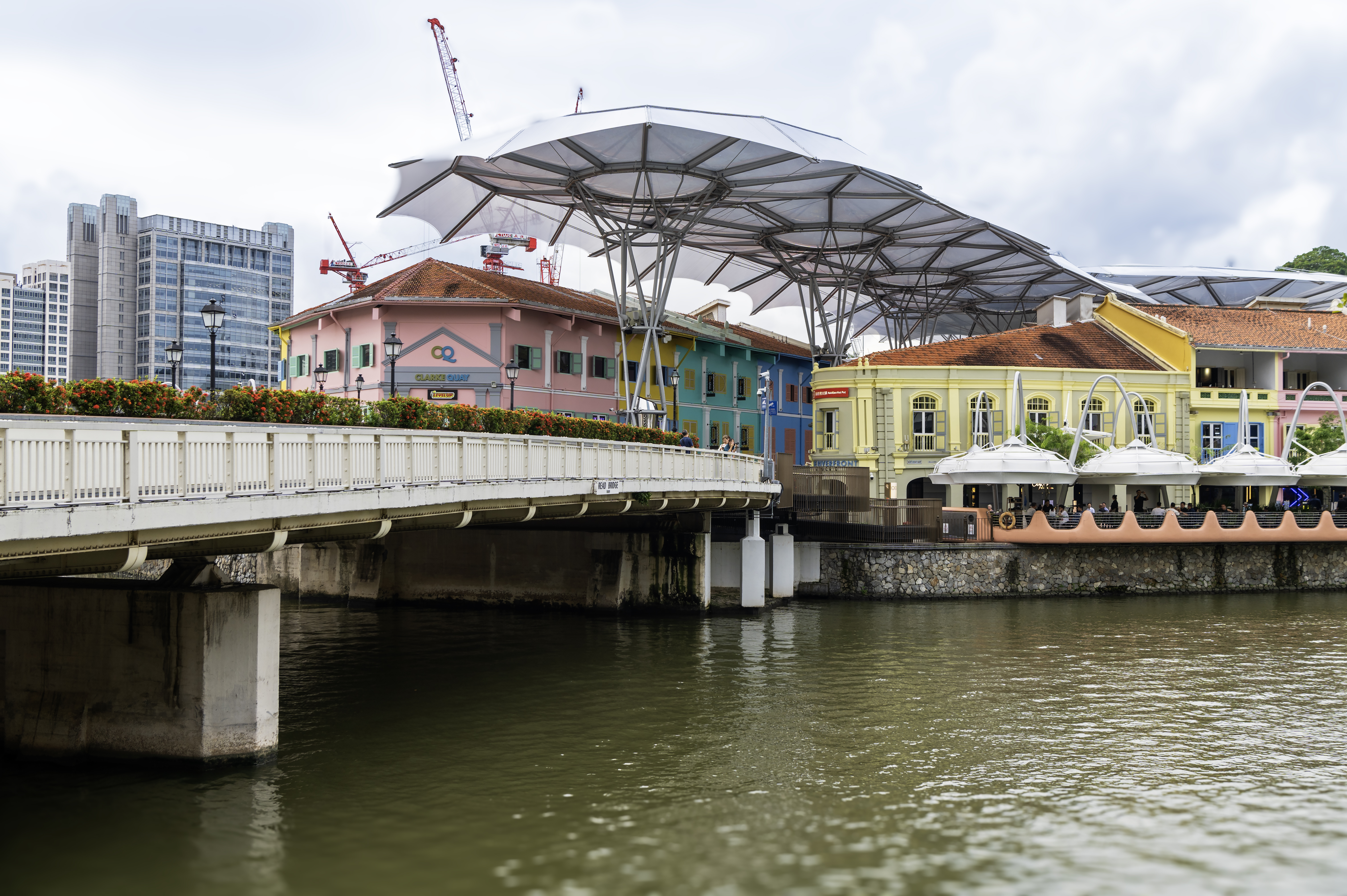
Read Bridge in June 2024.

Read Bridge is a beam-structured bridge located at Clarke Quay within the Singapore River Planning Area in Singapore. The bridge crosses the Singapore River linking Clarke Quay to Swissôtel Merchant Court. The bridge was built in 1881, completed in 1889 and opened on 18 April 1889. The bridge is opened to pedestrians and bicycles, and has been modified several times.

== History ==
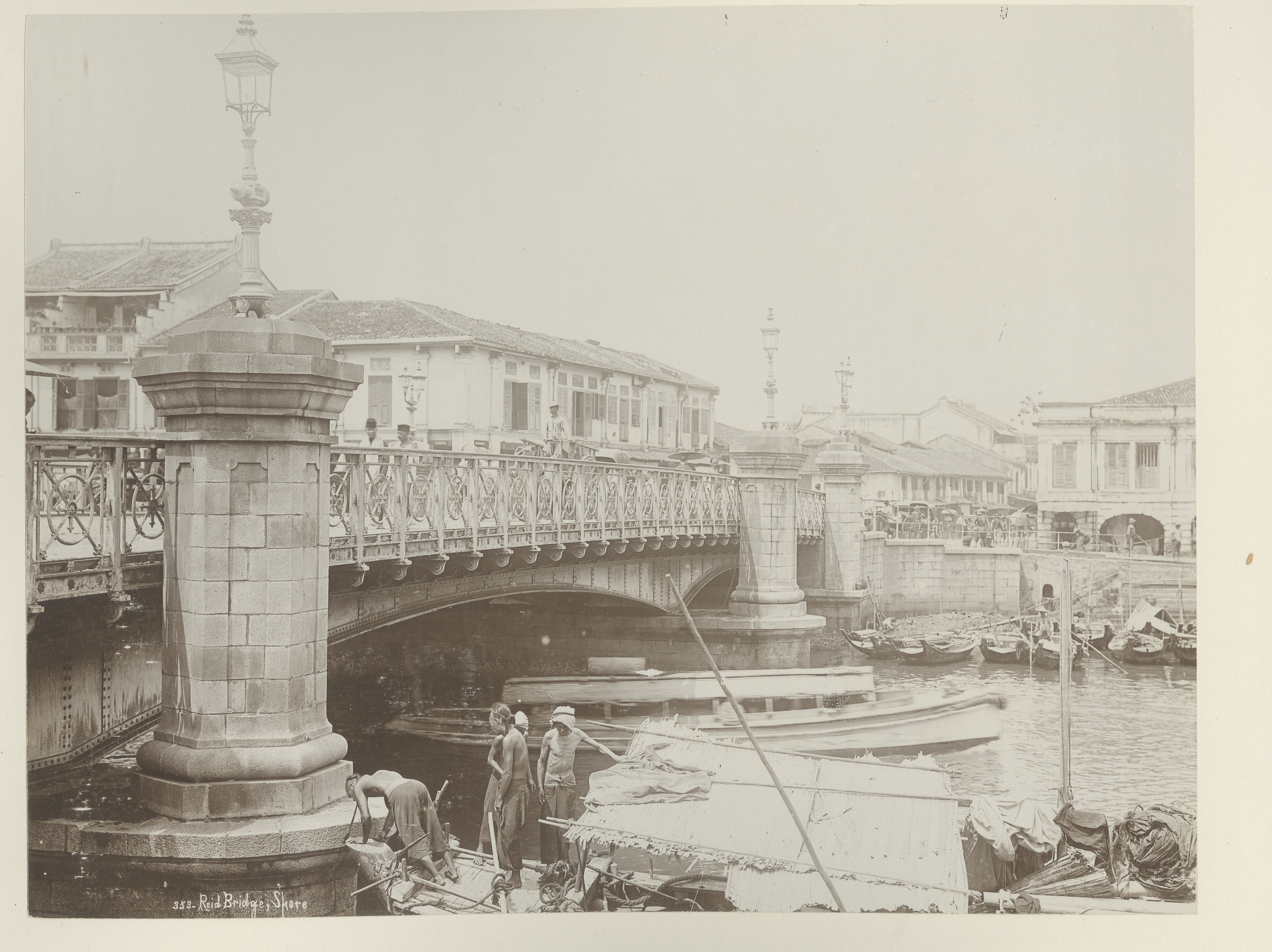
Read Bridge ca. 1900

Prior to the Read Bridge, Merchant's Bridge stood in its place. There were plans to replace the bridge according to Municipal Commissioners secretary D. G. Presgrave, though they were postponed until 1887. By that time, Merchant's Bridge was deemed to be "old, dangerous, and unsightly". It was decided that the new bridge would be named the Read Bridge after William Henry Macleod Read, a social activist. It would also be announced that a ceremony to initiate works on the bridge take place on 26 February. However, the ceremony took place on 1 March, with Read laying the first cylinder of the read bridge.

On 3 November 2008, the bridge was selected for conservation as part of the Urban Redevelopment Authority's expanded conservation programme.
