= Clemenceau Bridge =

Bridge in Singapore

Coordinates: 1.2907303°N 103.8423764°E

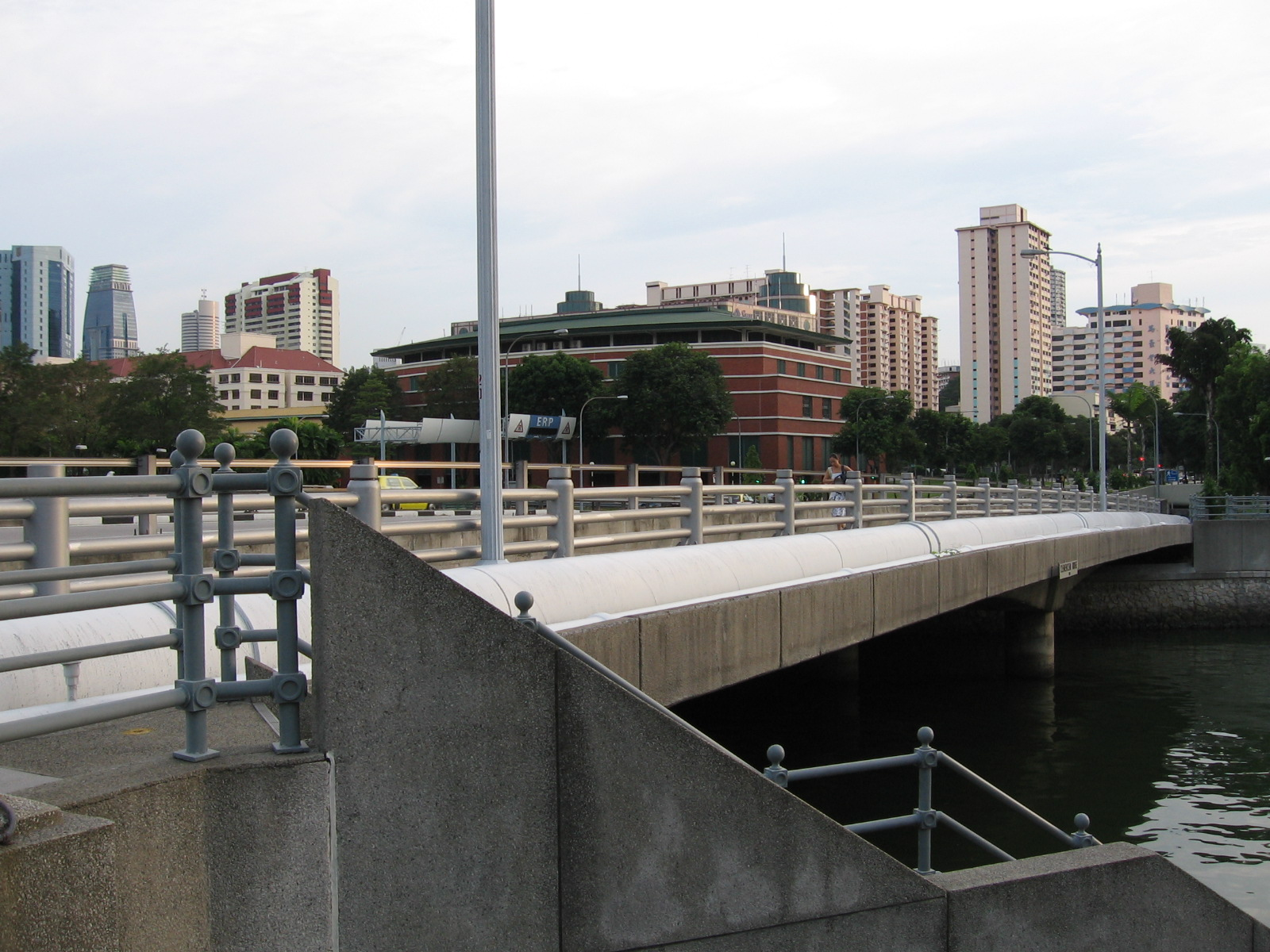
Clemenceau Bridge

The Clemenceau Bridge is a pre-stressed concrete road bridge across the Singapore River in Singapore. The first bridge was opened in 1940 and was refurbished in 1991. It was named after French Prime Minister Georges Clemenceau, who visited Singapore in 1920. The road, Clemenceau Avenue and Clemenceau Avenue North, was named after him, between Newton Circus and Havelock Road.

The first bridge could travel at 100 metres long and 18 metres wide. Boats can travel under the bridge up to 2 metres high. In 1989, it was being demolished to make way for the Central Expressway. After 1991, it was being rebuilt, the structure - ITS Centre, was being completed in 2000. It is also close to Fort Canning MRT station.
