= Dalhousie Obelisk =

Memorial in Empress Place, Singapore

Coordinates: 1°17′14.7″N 103°51′08″E

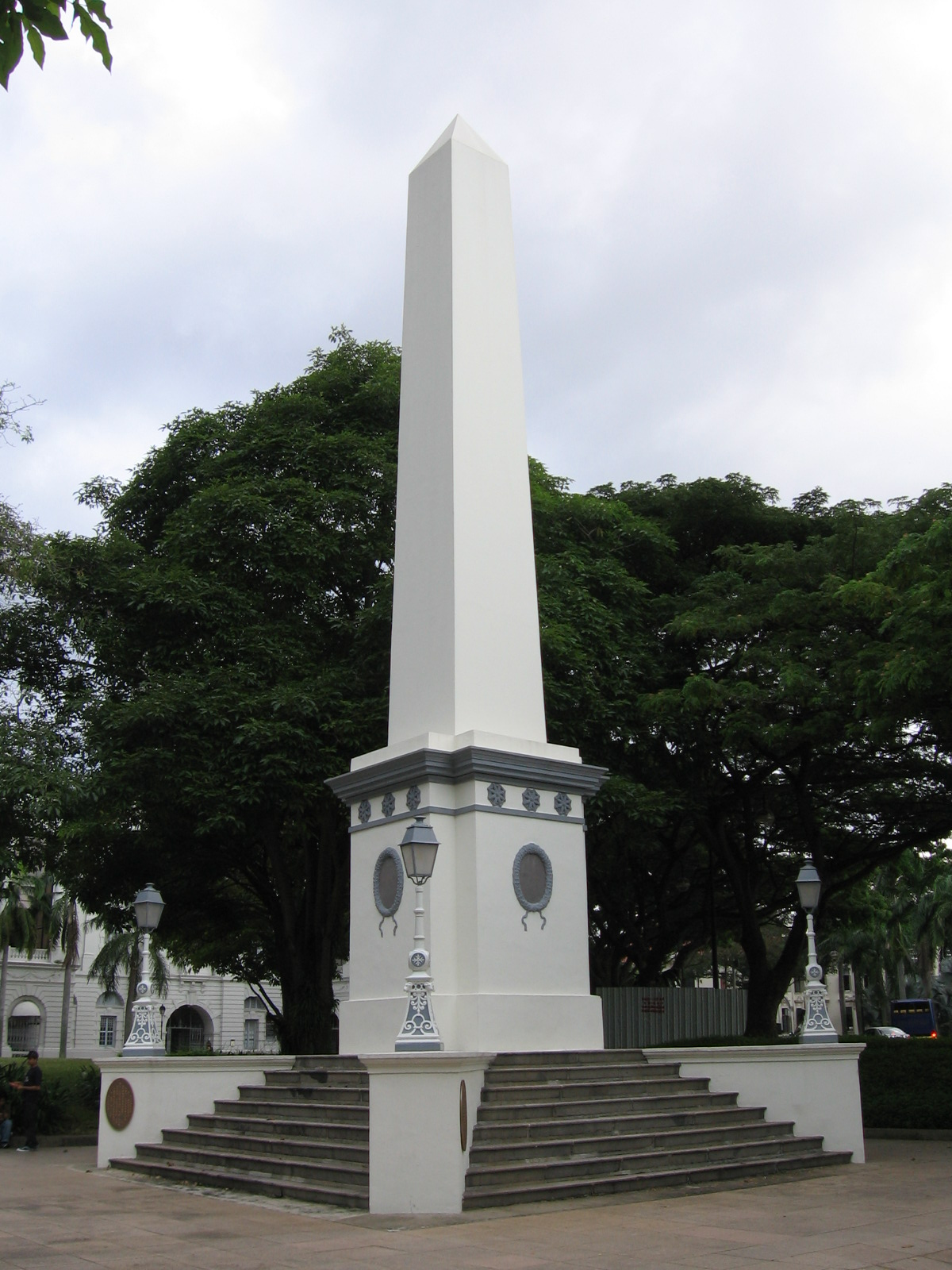
The Dalhousie Obelisk in 2006

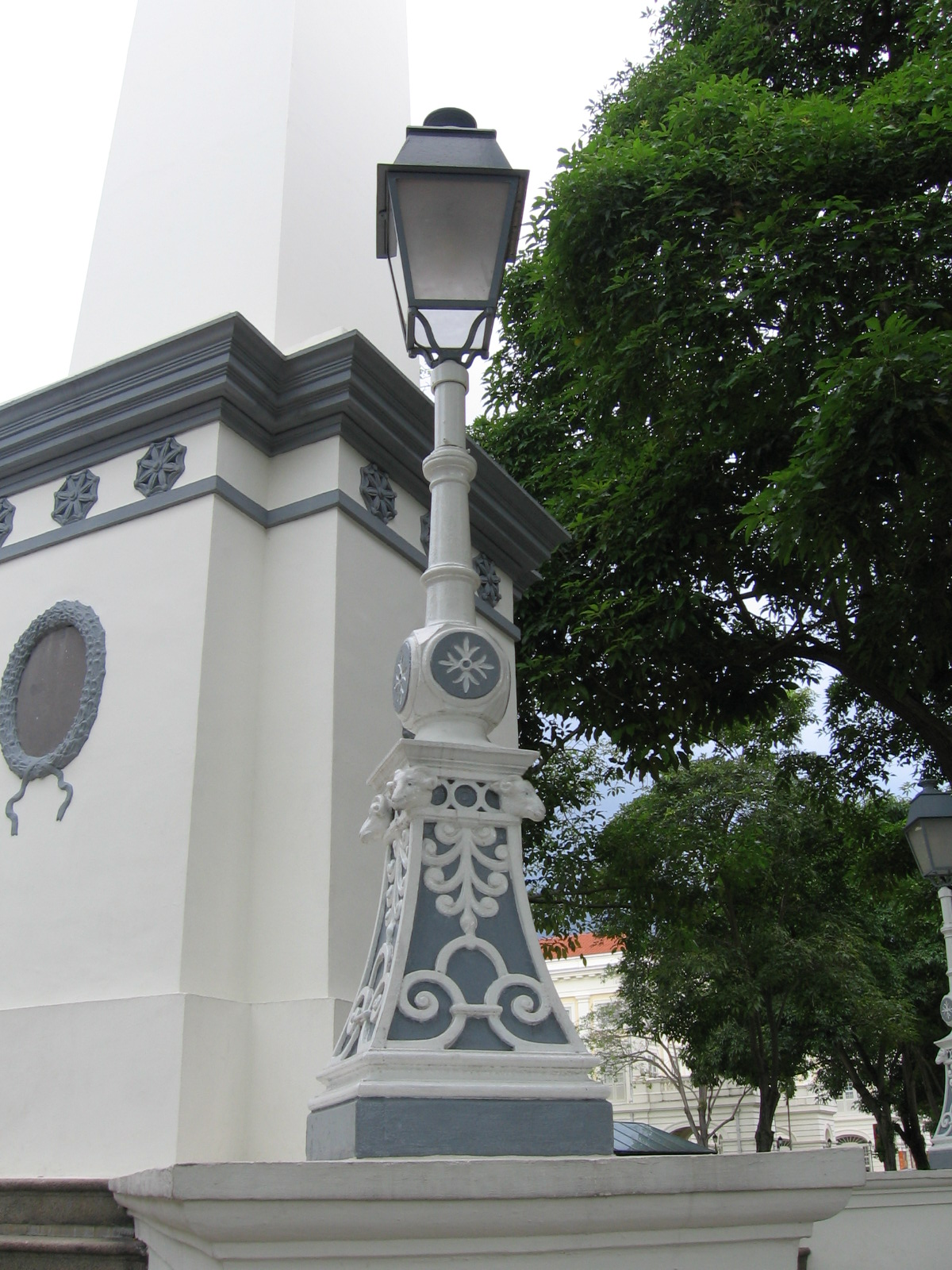
One of the decorative pinnacle lamps on the four corners of the Obelisk in 2006

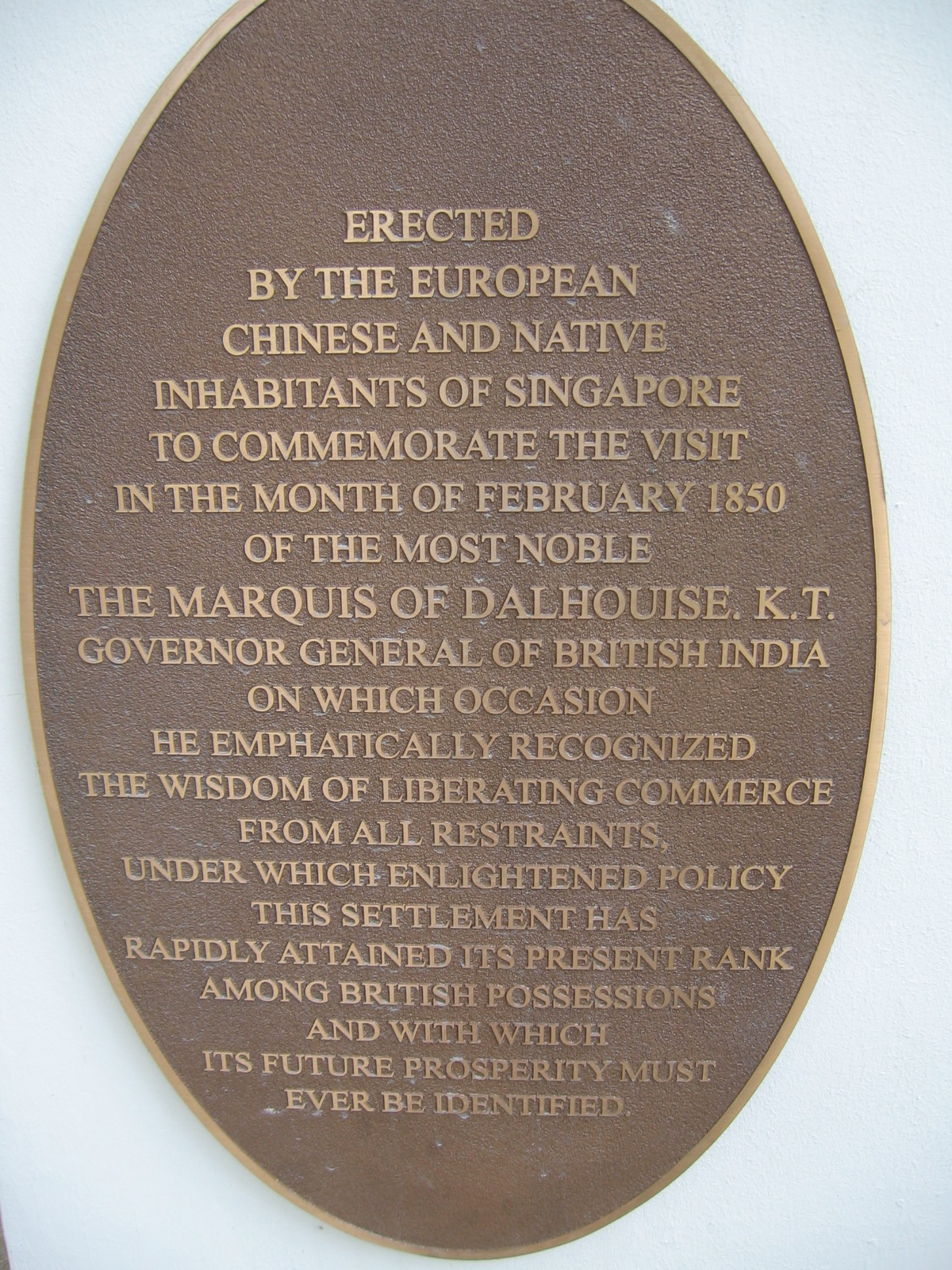
A commemorative plaque on the Obelisk in 2006

The Dalhousie Obelisk is a memorial obelisk in the Civic District of Singapore, located on the north bank of the Singapore River in the Downtown Core, within the Central Area in Singapore's central business district.

The memorial is erected to commemorate the visit of James Broun-Ramsay, 1st Marquis of Dalhousie to Singapore in 1850. The obelisk is situated at Empress Place, near the Asian Civilisations Museum and the Victoria Theatre and Concert Hall, and the Anderson Bridge near the mouth of the Singapore River.

== Architecture ==
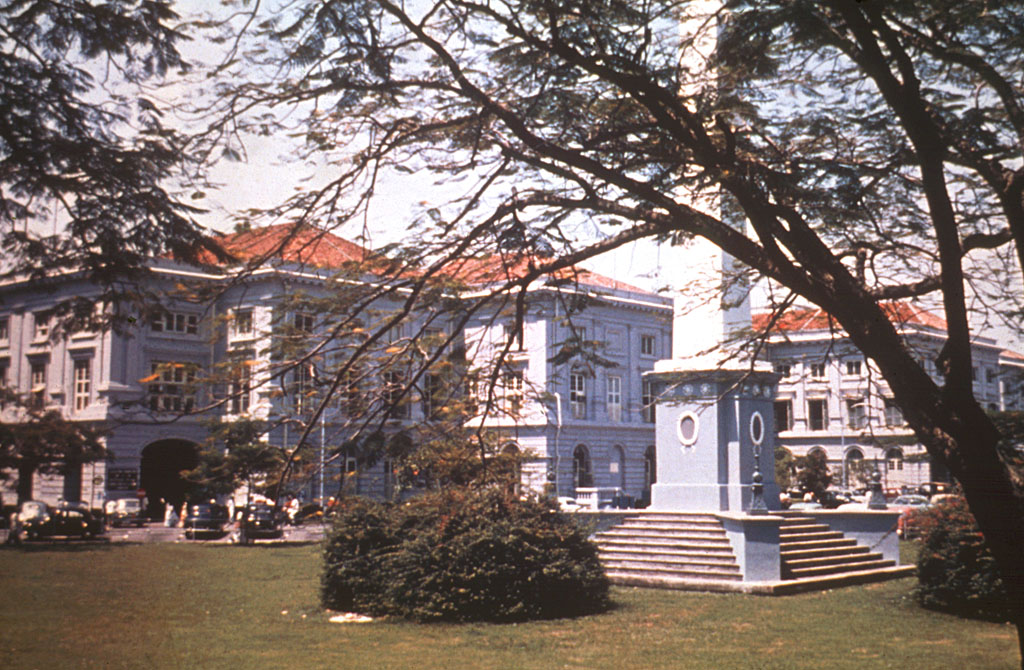
The Dalhousie Obelisk, as well as the Empress Place Building, in 1965

The Dalhousie Obelisk is an important architectural element in Empress Place but somewhat neglected and obscured by trees. It was designed by John Turnbull Thomson when he was a Government Surveyor. He was obviously inspired by "Cleopatra's Needle" on the Thames Embankment in London.
