= Singapore River =

Coordinates: 1°17′15″N 103°51′11″E

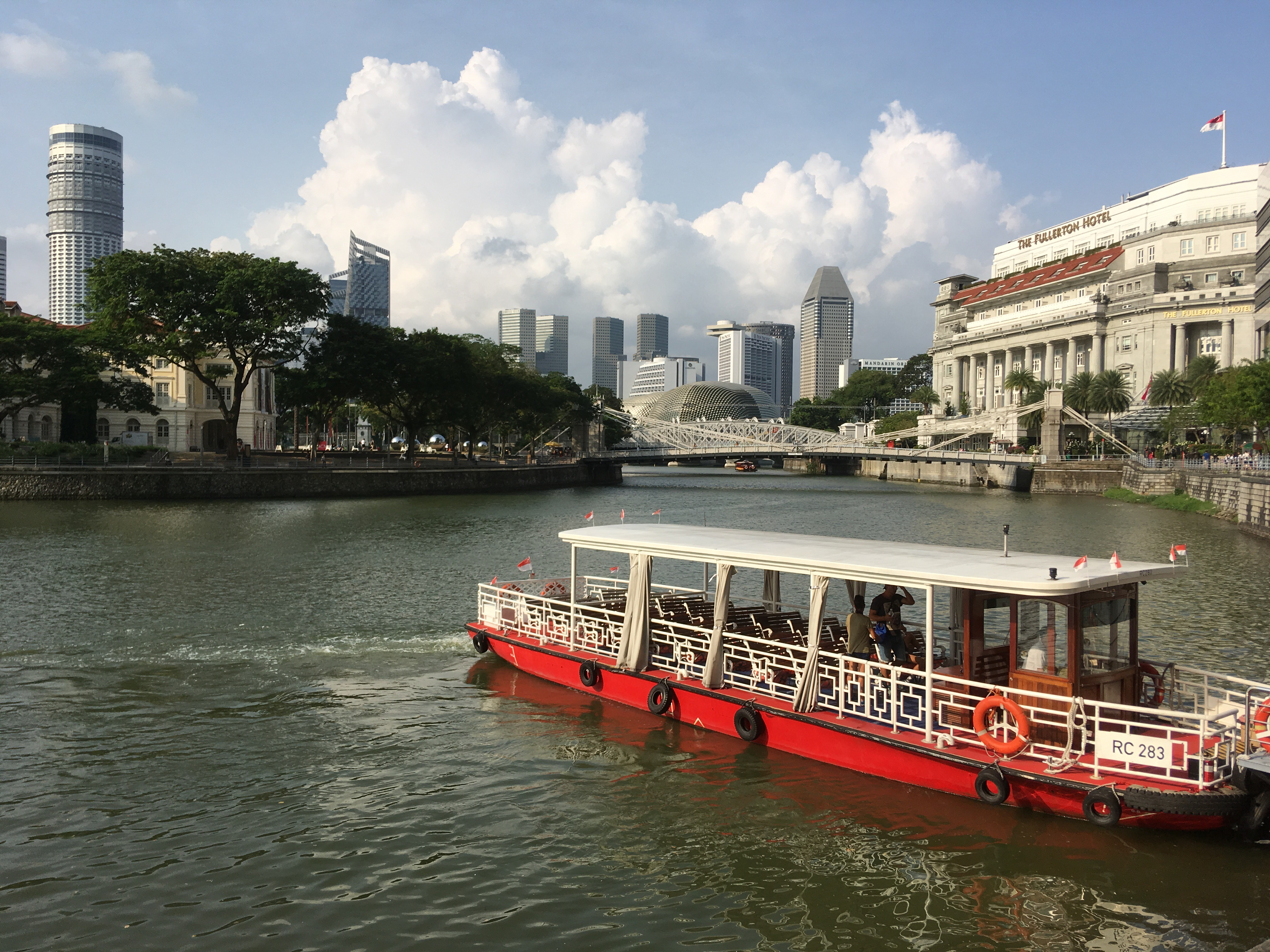
- Singapore River flowing through Singapore's central business district.

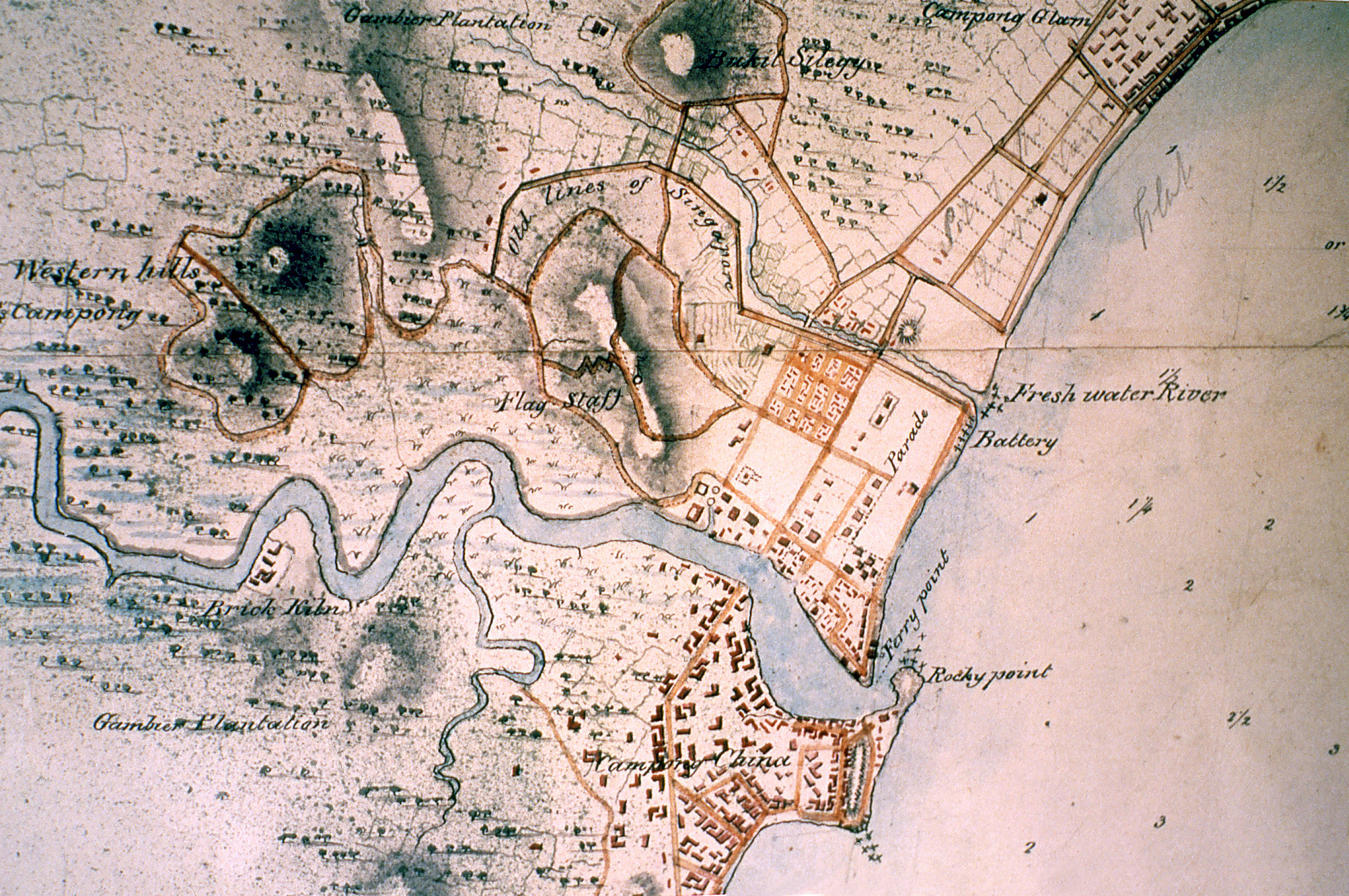
- Early 19th century map of the Singapore River basin.
- Native name: Sungai Singapura (Malay); 新加坡河 (Chinese); சிங்கப்பூர் நதி (Tamil)

Location
- Country: Singapore

Physical characteristics
- Source
  - location: Alexandra Canal
- Mouth
  - location: Marina Channel
- Length: 3.2 km (2.0 mi)

Singapore River
- Planning Area

Other transcription(s)
  - Chinese: 新加坡河; Xīnjiāpō hé (Pinyin); Sin-ka-pho hô (Hokkien POJ)
  - Malay: Sungai Singapura (Rumi) سوڠاي سيڠاڤورا (Jawi)
  - Tamil: சிங்கப்பூர் நதி Ciṅkappūr nati (Transliteration)
- Location in Central Region
- Country: Singapore
- Region: Central Region
- CDC: Central Singapore CDC
- Town council: Tanjong Pagar Town Council; Jalan Besar Town Council
- Constituency: Tanjong Pagar GRC; Jalan Besar GRC
- DGP exhibited: 1994
- PA incorporated: 22 January 1999

Government
  - Mayor: Central Singapore CDC: Denise Phua
  - Members of Parliament: Tanjong Pagar GRC: Alvin Tan; Jalan Besar GRC: Denise Phua

Area
  - Total: 0.96 km^{2} (0.37 sq mi)
  - Rank: 52nd

Population (2024)
  - Total: 4,380
  - Rank: 34th
  - Density: 4,600/km^{2} (12,000/sq mi)
  - Rank: 30th
- Postal district: 01, 03, 06, 09, 10

The Singapore River is a river that flows parallel to Alexandra Road and feeds into the Marina Reservoir in the southern part of Singapore. The immediate upper watershed of the Singapore River is known as the Singapore River Planning Area, although the western part of the watershed is classified under the River Valley planning area.

Singapore River planning area sits within Singapore's Central Area of the Central Region, as defined by the Urban Redevelopment Authority. The planning area shares boundaries with the following – River Valley and Museum to the north, Tanglin and Bukit Merah to the west, Outram to the south, and the Downtown Core to the east. The planning area is split into the three wharfs or quays in the area, Robertson Quay being the largest and most upstream, followed by Clarke Quay and Boat Quay.

Since 2008, the Singapore River was turned into a fresh water river after the completion of the Marina Barrage at Marina South.

== Geography ==
The Singapore River is approximately 3.2 kilometers long from its source at Kim Seng Bridge to where it empties into Marina Bay; the river extends more than two kilometers beyond its original source at Kim Seng Bridge as Alexandra Canal, as far as the junction of Commonwealth Avenue.

== History ==
Old maps of the river state that it originates from Bukit Larangan (currently Fort Canning Hill).

=== Heavy traffic ===
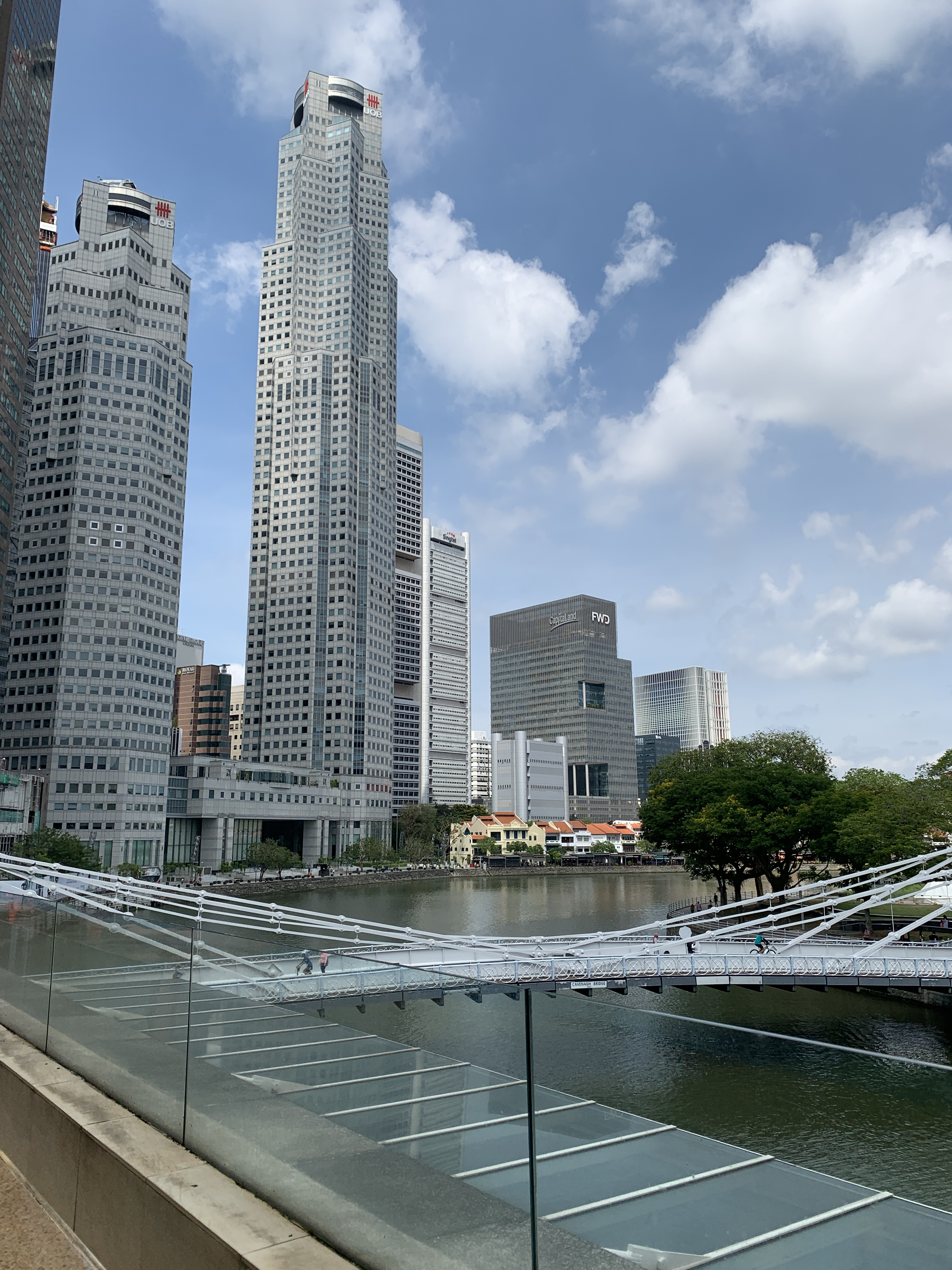
Commercial skyscrapers across the Singapore River

From 1819, there was heavy traffic on the Singapore River due to rapid urbanization and expanding trade. There was significant water pollution caused by the disposal of garbage, sewage and other by-products of industries located along the river's banks. The sources of water pollution in the Singapore River and Kallang Basin included waste from pig and duck farms, unsewered premises, street hawkers and vegetable wholesalers. Riverine activities such as transport, boat building and repairs were also found along the Singapore River.

Some 750 lighters plied along the Singapore River and Kallang Basin in 1977. Waste, oil spills and wastewater from these boats and lighters added to the pollution of the rivers. In 1977, Prime Minister Lee called for a clean-up of Singapore's rivers, which included the Singapore River and the Kallang River. The clean-up cost the government $300 million at the time and involved the relocation of about 4,000 squatters, along with hawkers and vegetable sellers, whose daily waste flowed into the river. Public housing was found for the squatters, while street hawkers were persuaded to move to established hawker centres. The government then completely dredged foul-smelling mud from the banks and the bottom of the river, clearing the debris and other rubbish.

=== Singapore River today ===
Due to such cleaning efforts, the Singapore River has significantly changed from one that was heavily busy and polluted to one that is clean for marine animals. The re-emergence of monitor lizards and otters in the Singapore River has been attributed to the success of the river's cleanup.

Whereas the original mouth of the Singapore River emptied into Singapore Straits and its southern islands before major land reclamation took place, the Singapore River now empties into Marina Bay – an area of water partially enclosed by the reclamation work.

The Port of Singapore is now located to the west of the island, using most of the south-west coast, and passenger ships to Singapore now typically berth at the Singapore Cruise Centre at Harbourfront. Thus the Singapore River's economic role has shifted away from one that of trade, towards more a role accommodated for tourism and aesthetics for the commercial zone which encloses it. Traversing across the river is done via water taxis.

The river is now part of the Marina Reservoir after damming the Singapore River at its outlet to the sea to create a new reservoir of freshwater. The dam is known as the Marina Barrage.

== Sculptures ==
There are a number of sculptures along the Singapore River. Many of these depict the life of people living and working along the river during the early days of Singapore.

Notable sculptures include:

- First Generation, made by Chong Fah Cheong
- Fishing at Singapore River, made by Chern Lian Shan
- The River Merchants, made by Aw Tee Hong
- A Great Emporium, made by Malcolm Koh
- From Chettiars to Financiers, made by Chern Lian Shan
- Singapura Cats, made by various artists

== Bridges and tunnels ==
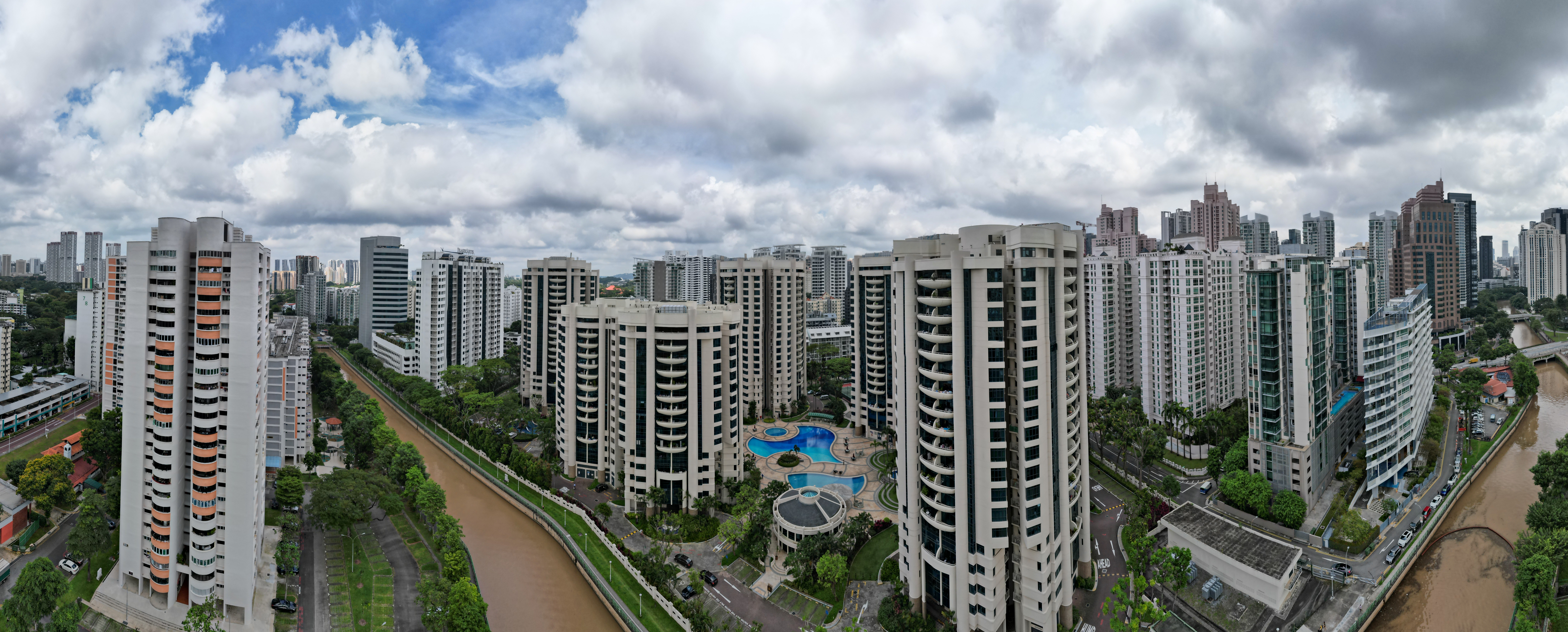
Singapore river in River Valley facing North-west

Between 1819, when the first wooden jetty and the first bridge were built over the Singapore River in Singapore, and in 2015, 14 bridges were built across the river (or 17, although the Marina Reservoir, where the estuary is now located, is considered a Singapore River). Until 1819, the river could only be crossed by boats and ferries. Some of the bridges were demolished and rebuilt or their purpose was changed.

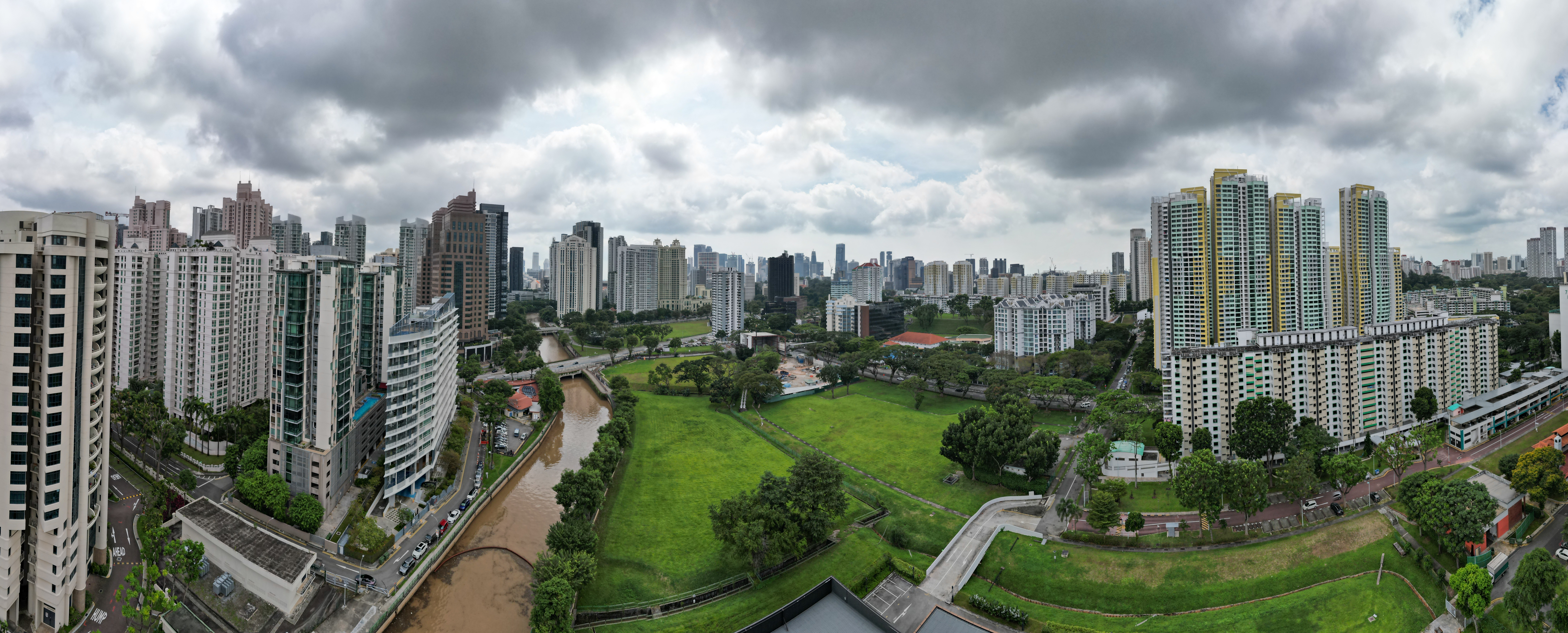
Singapore river at River Valley. Facing South.

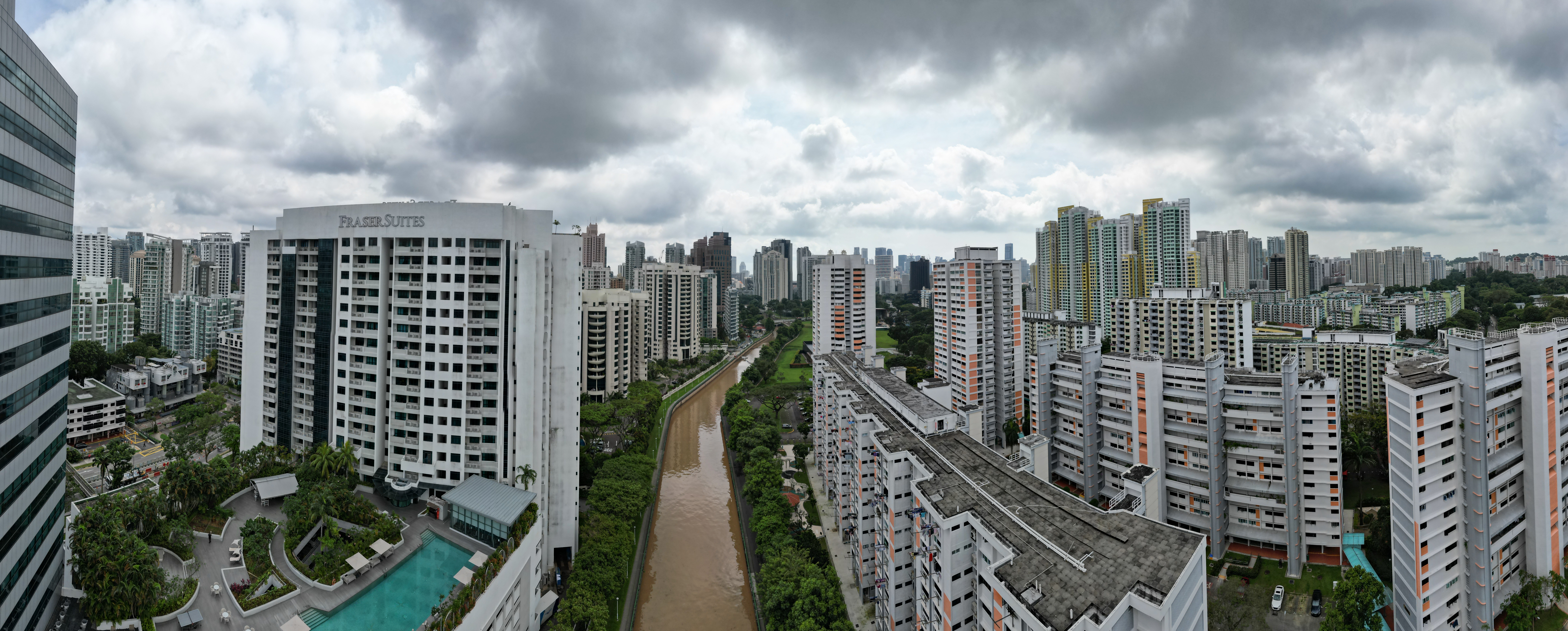
Singapore River at River Valley facing west

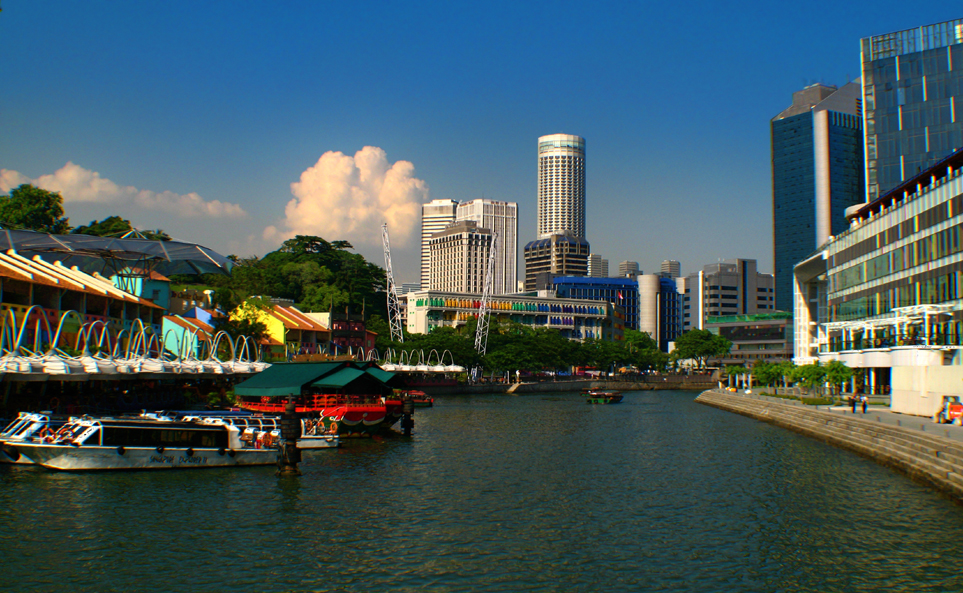
Clarke Quay along the banks of the Singapore River

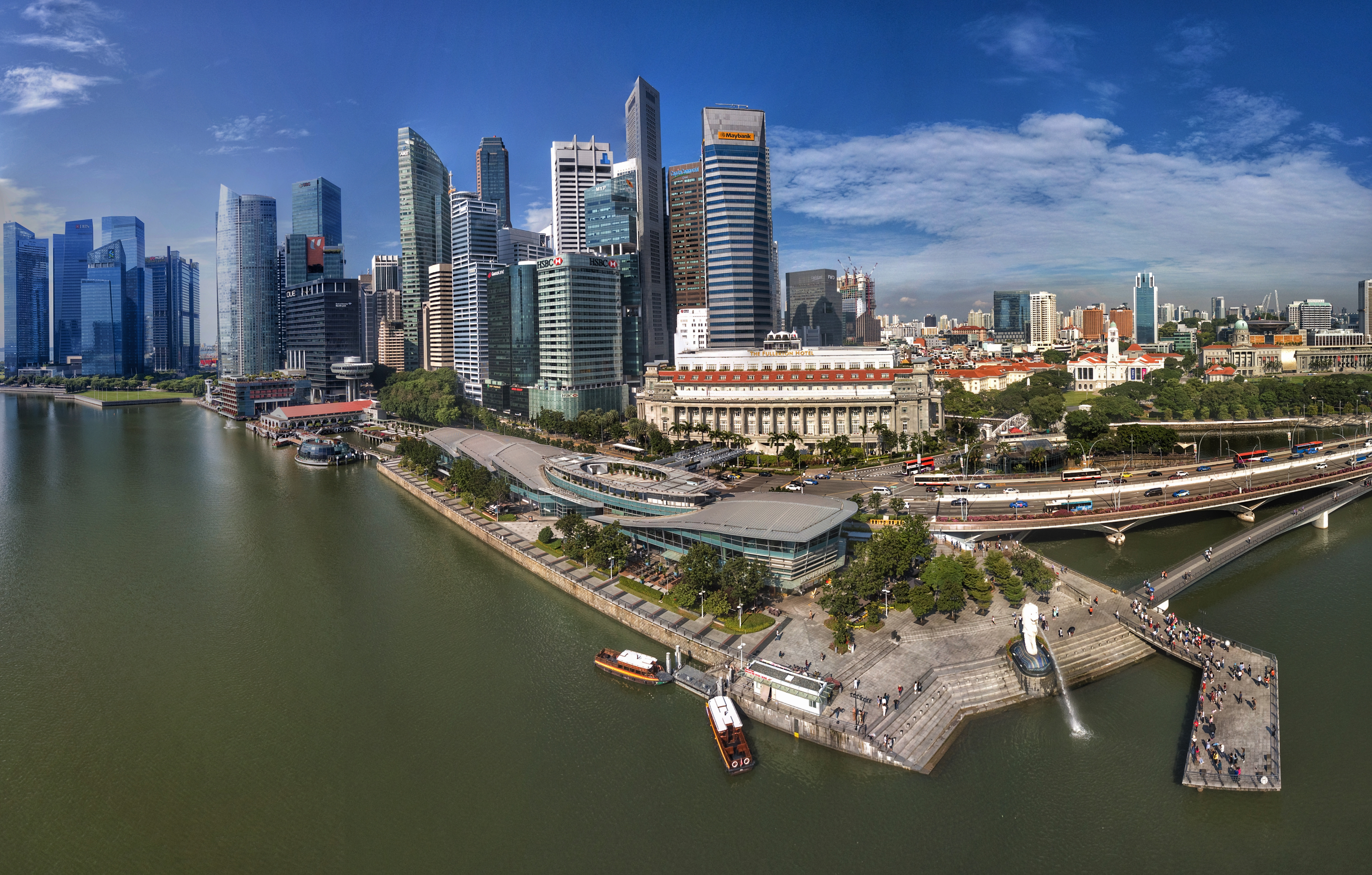
Aerial Panorama of Merlion Park. The Singapore River ends its journey here

The first bridge in Singapore was built over the Singapore river in 1819 where the Elgin Bridge now stands. There have been two Elgin bridges at some point. The first iron-made Elgin Bridge was built in 1862 and named after Lord Elgin. It was later demolished and replaced with the current Elgin bridge in 1926. Other bridges along the river include the Coleman Bridge (1840), Kim Seng Bridge (1862), Cavenagh Bridge (1869), and Read Bridge (1889). The most recent bridges are the Helix Bridge (2010), Bayfront Bridge (2010), and the Jubilee Bridge (2015).

- Coleman Bridge (1840/1985)
- Kim Seng Bridge (1862)
- Elgin Bridge (1862/1926)
- Cavenagh Bridge (1870)
- Ord Bridge (1886)
- Read Bridge (1889)
- Pulau Saigon Bridge (1890)
- Anderson Bridge (1910)
- Clemenceau Bridge (1940)
- Benjamin Sheares Bridge (1981)
- East West MRT line and North South MRT line between City Hall and Raffles Place (1987/1989)
- Chin Swee Tunnel carrying the Central Expressway (1991)
- Esplanade Bridge (1997)
- Robertson Bridge (1998)
- Jiak Kim Bridge (1999)
- Alkaff Bridge (1999)
- North East MRT line between Clarke Quay and Dhoby Ghaut (2003)
- Helix Bridge (2010)
- Bayfront Bridge (2010)
- Downtown MRT line and Circle MRT line between Promenade and Bayfront (2012)
- Jubilee Bridge (2015)
- Downtown MRT line between Fort Canning and Chinatown (2017)
- Thomson–East Coast MRT line between Great World and Havelock (2022)

== Gallery ==
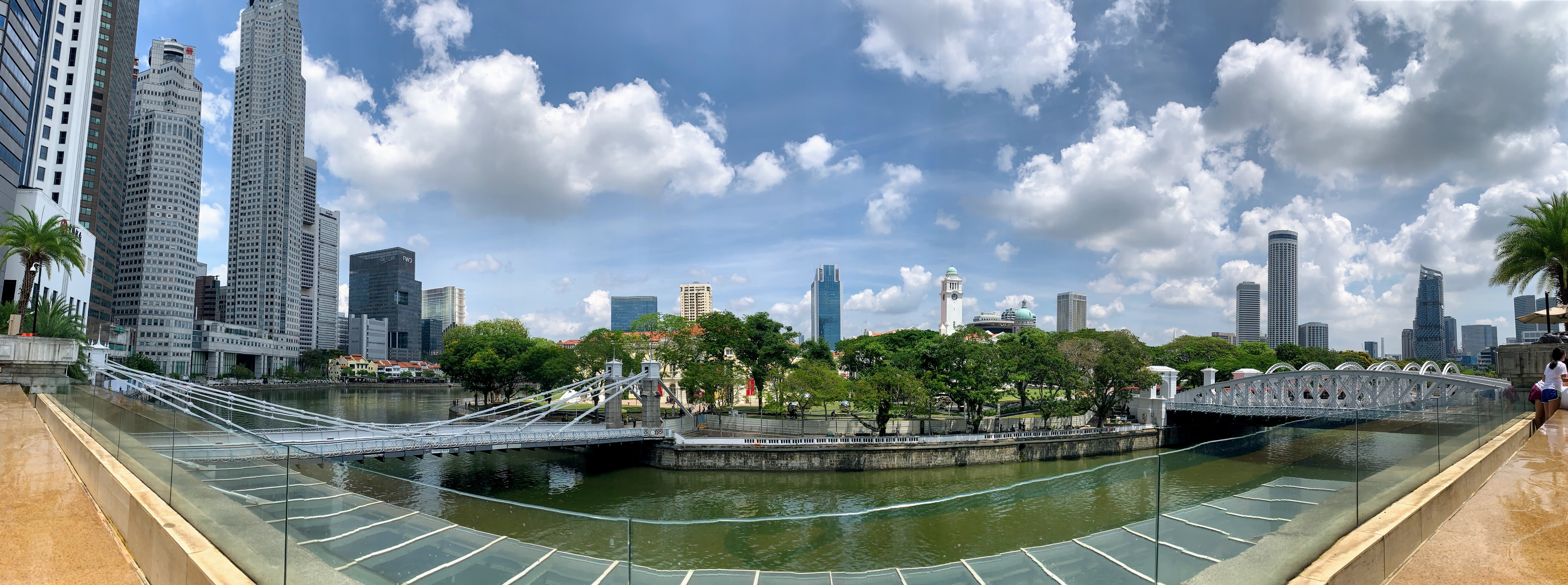
Panoramic view of the Singapore River
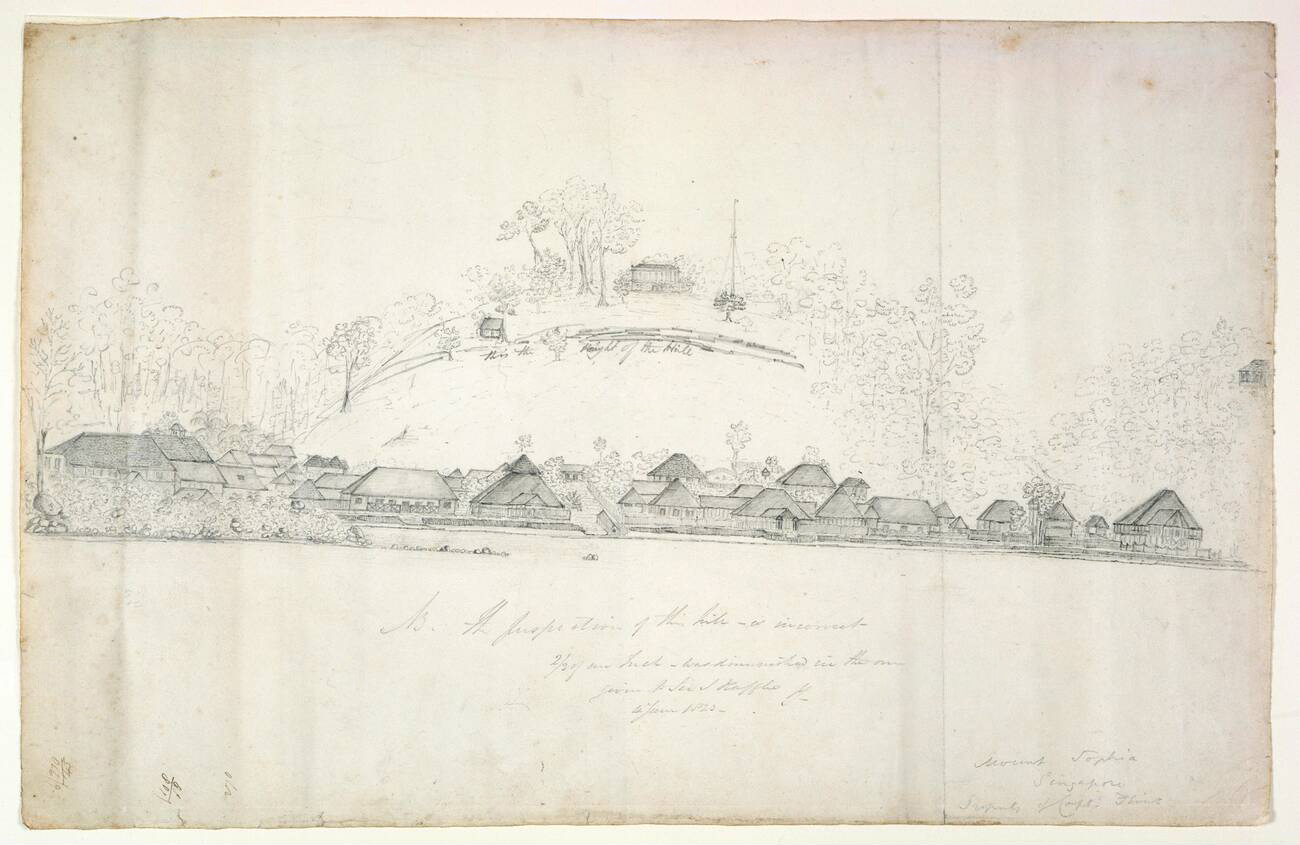
Inlet of the river in earliest known drawing of the settlement of Singapore by Lt. Phillip Jackson, 1823

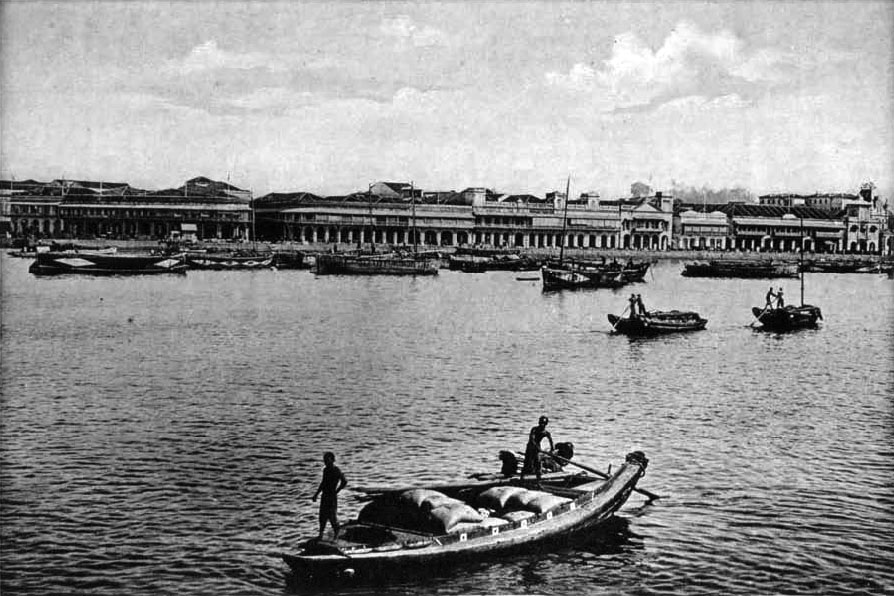
As viewed from what is now Marina Bay, Singapore, circa 1900s

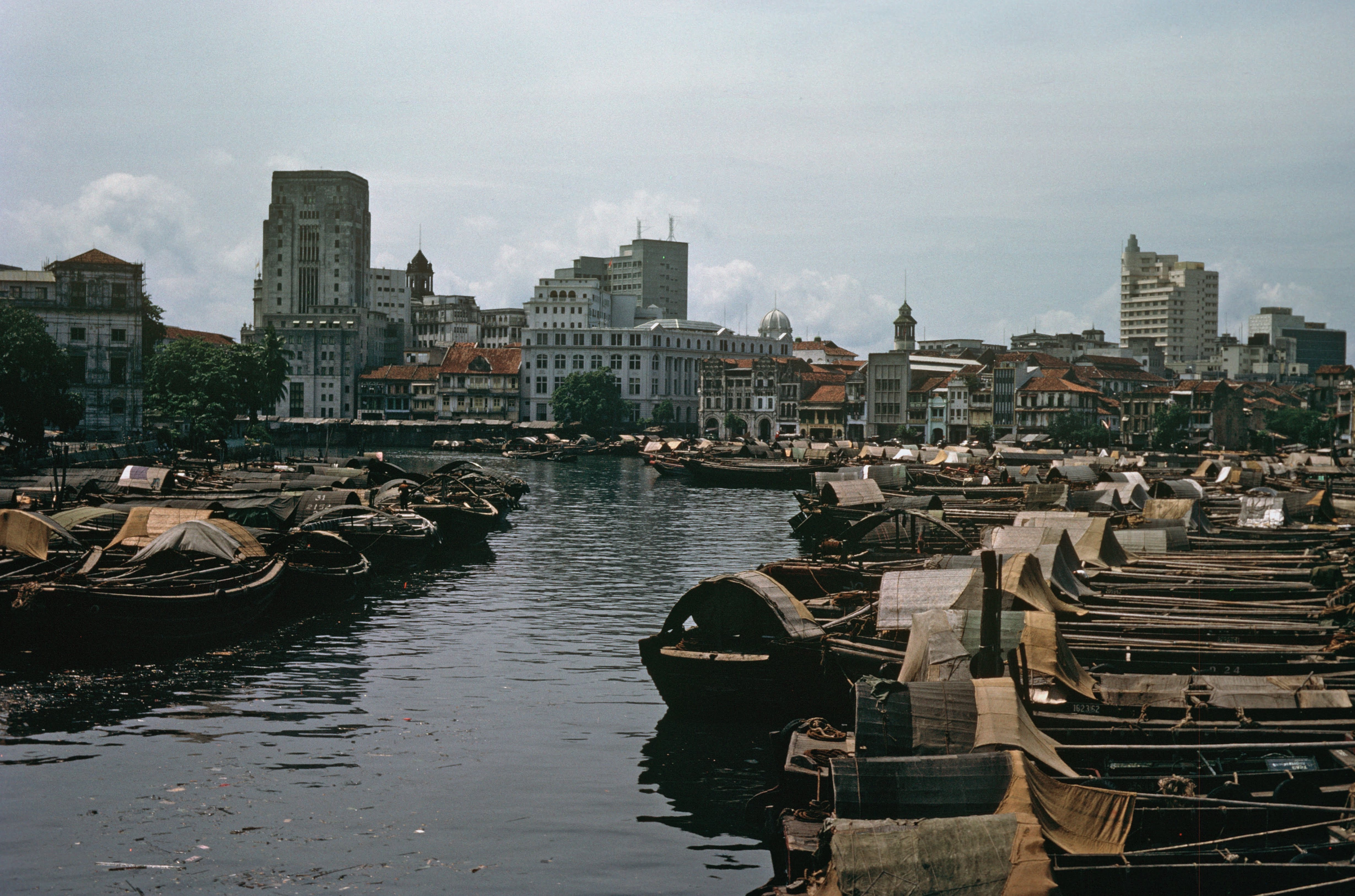
Singapore River in the early 1960s

=== Artwork along the Singapore River ===
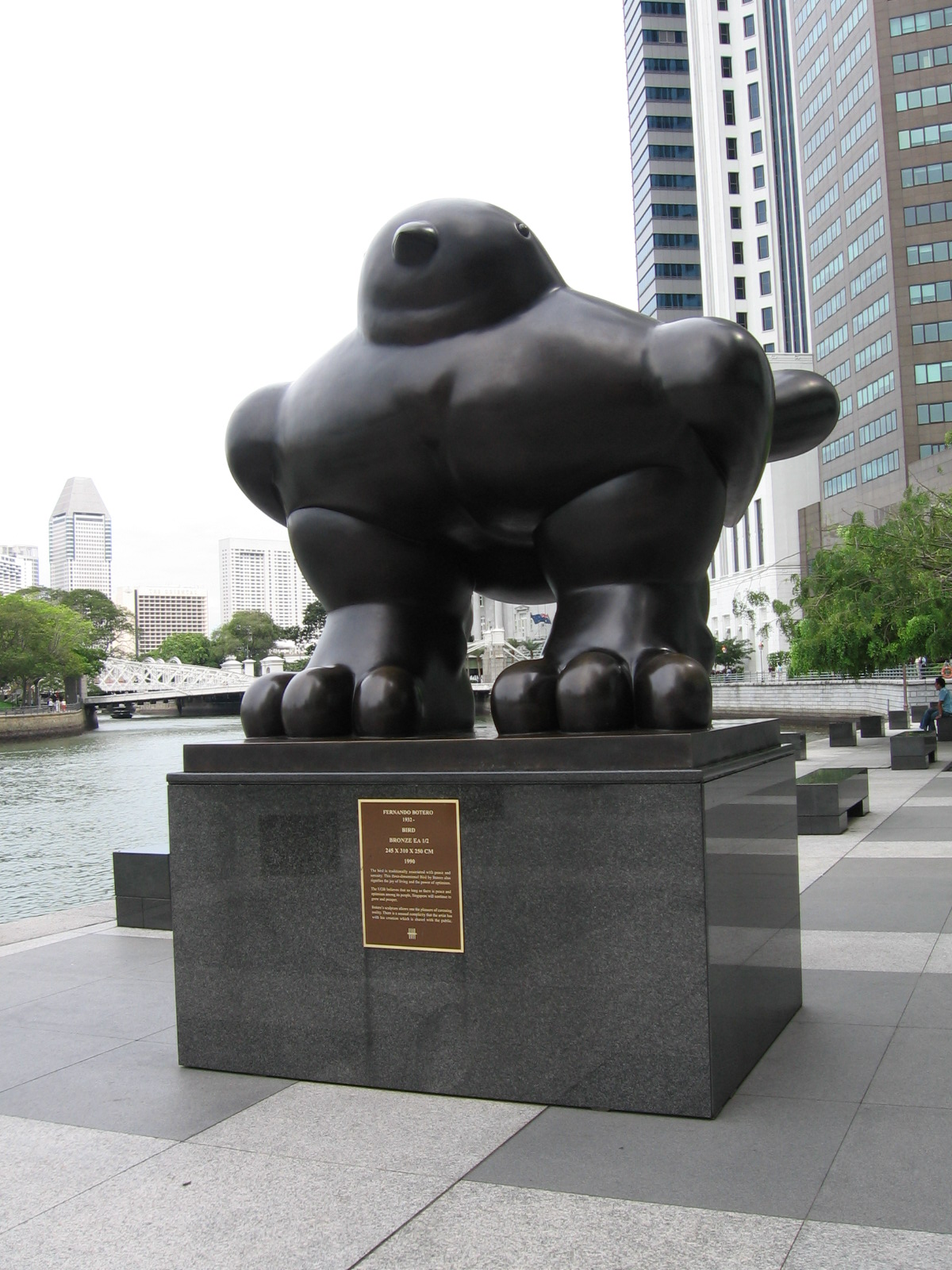
Bird Sculpture by Fernando Botero

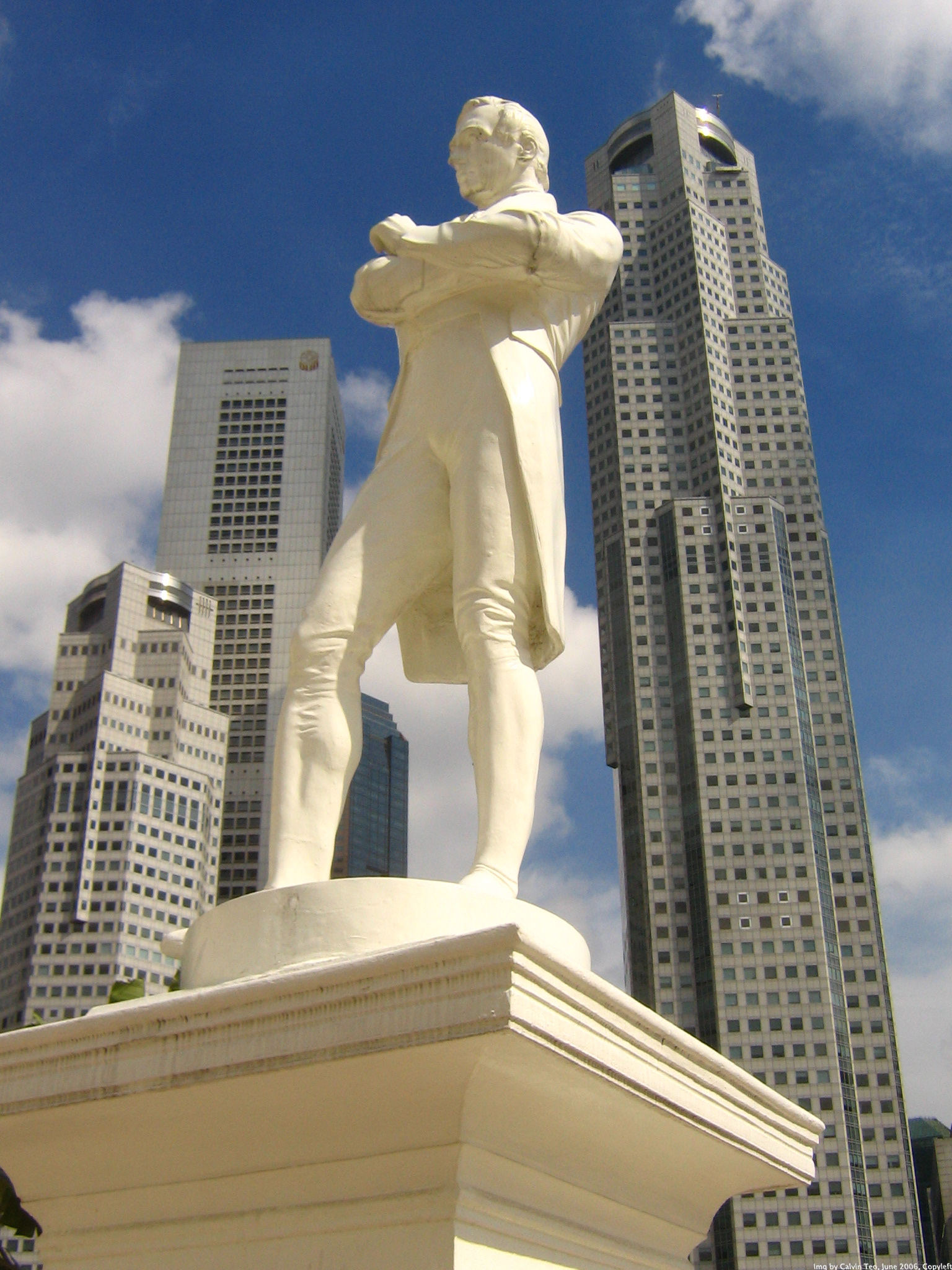
Statue of Stamford Raffles

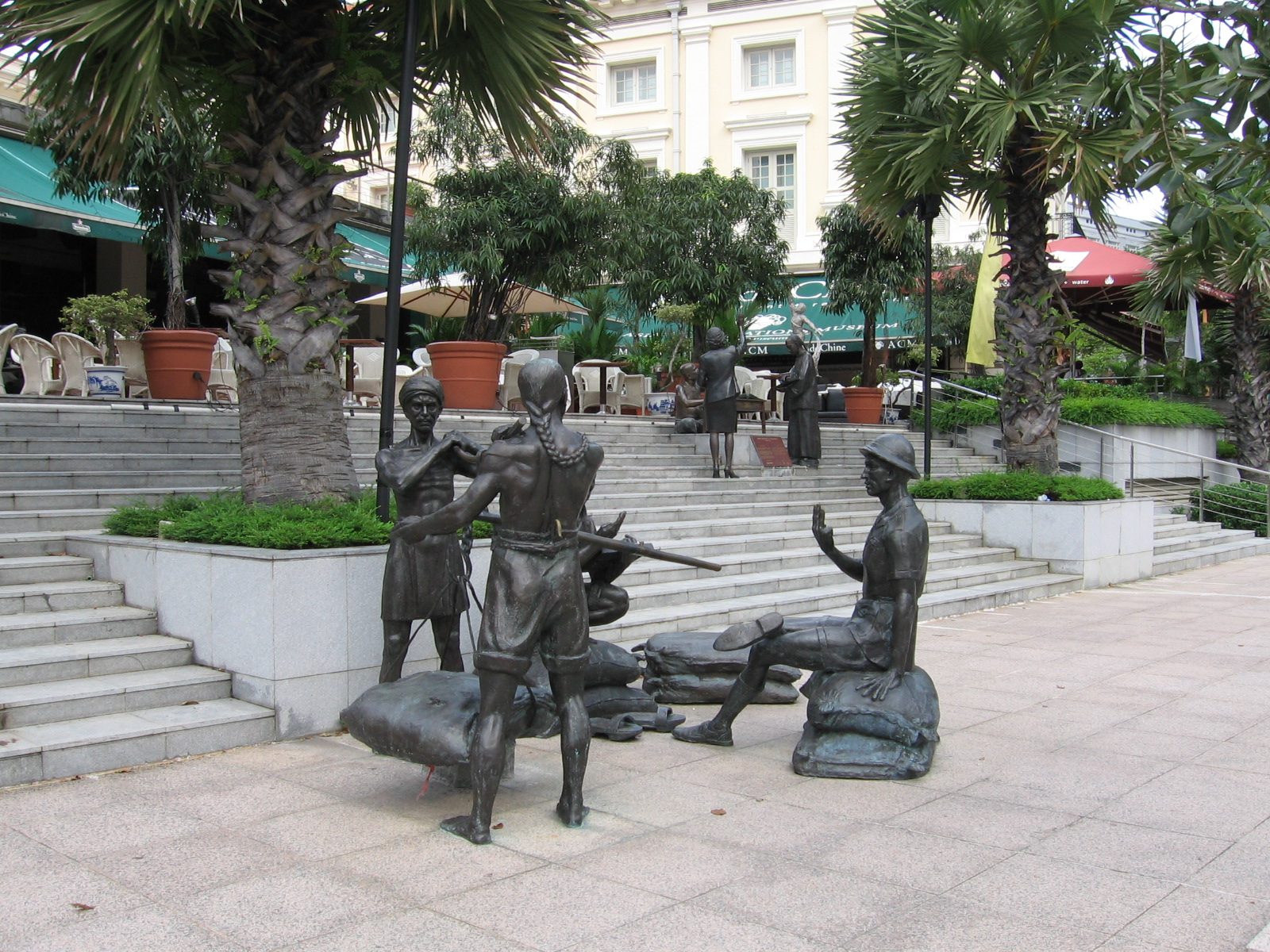
A Great Emporium by Malcolm Koh

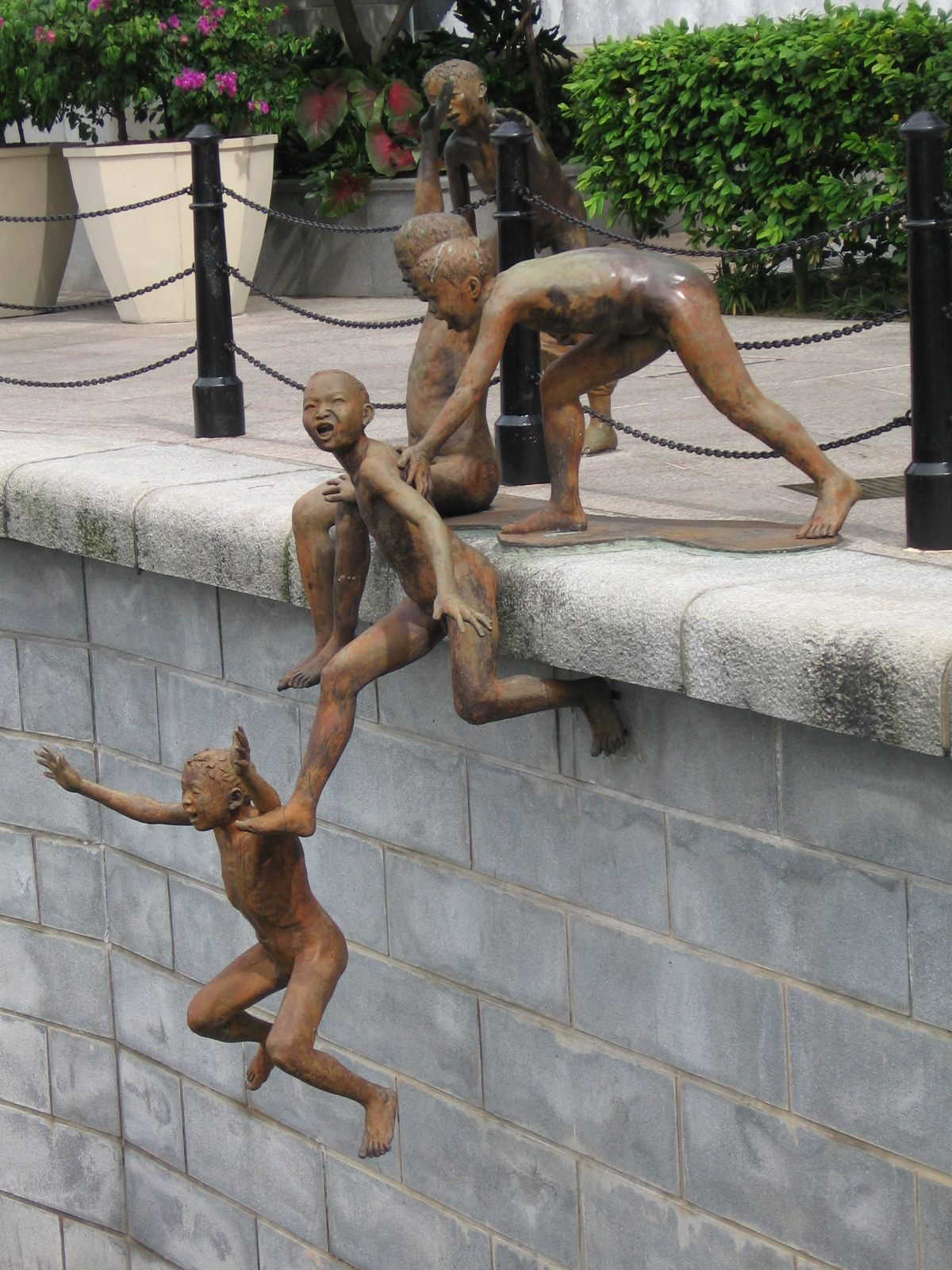
The First Generation by Chong Fah Cheong

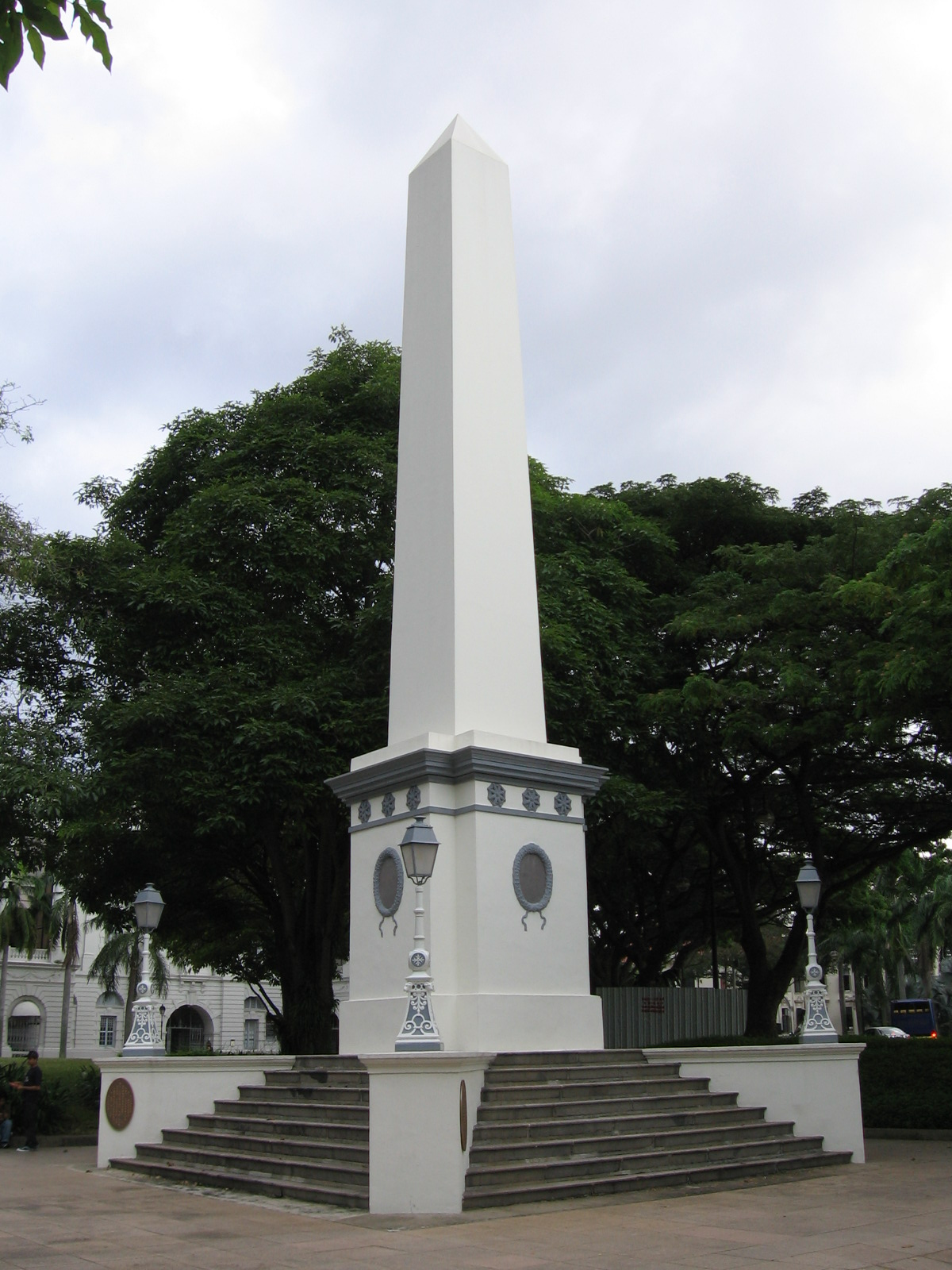
The Dalhousie Obelisk

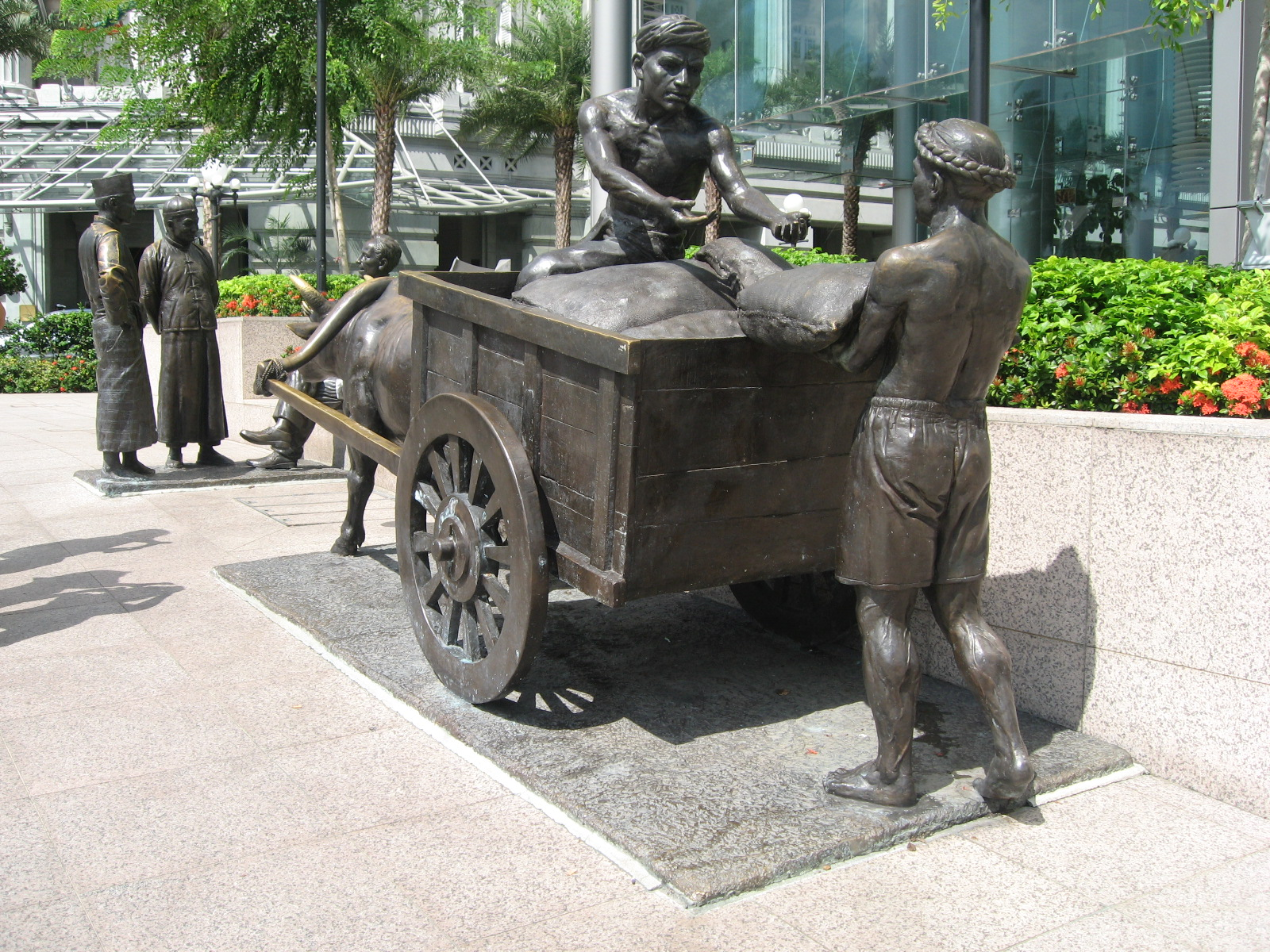
The River Merchants by Aw Tee Hong

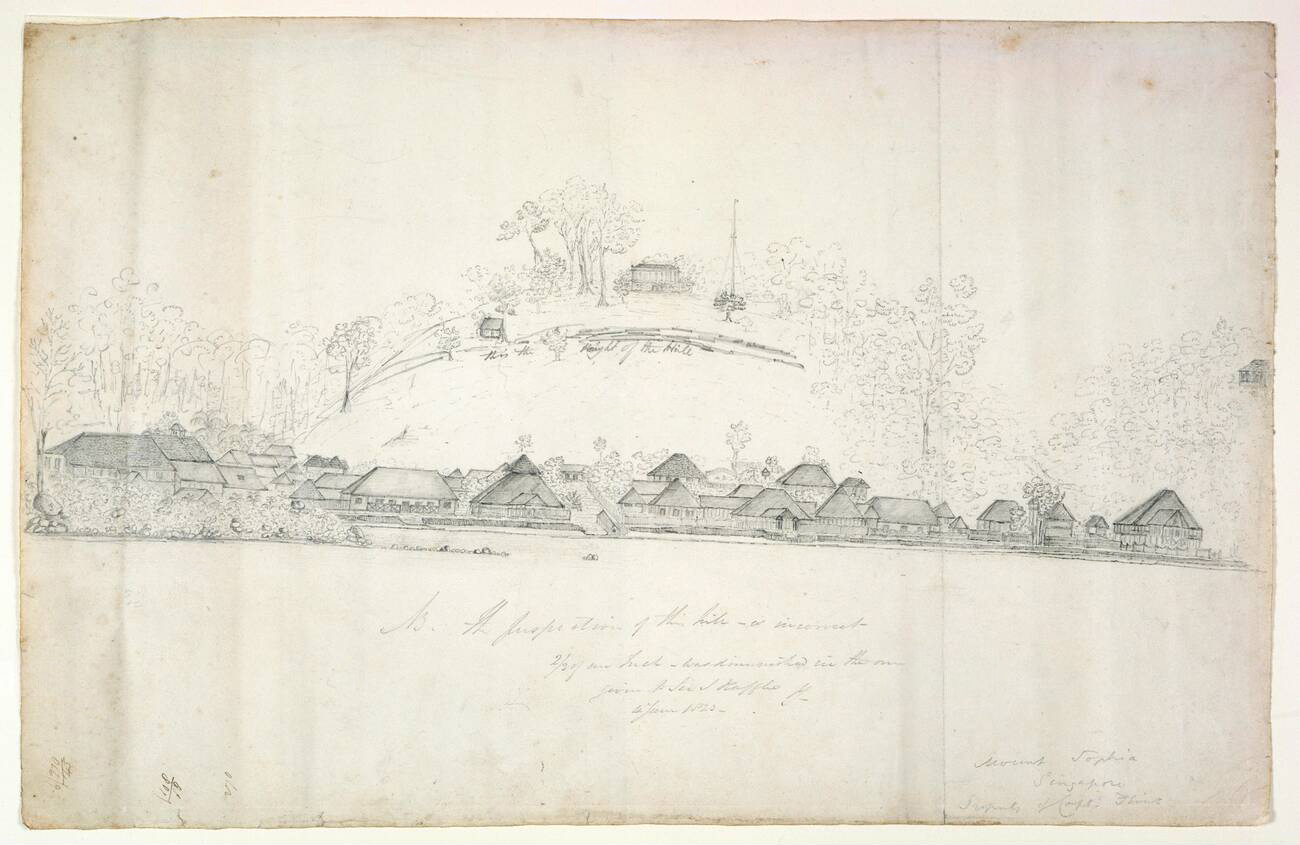
Inlet of the river in earliest known drawing of the settlement of Singapore by Lt. Phillip Jackson, 1823
