= Alexandra Canal, Singapore =

Canal in Singapore

Coordinates: 1°18′N 103°47′E

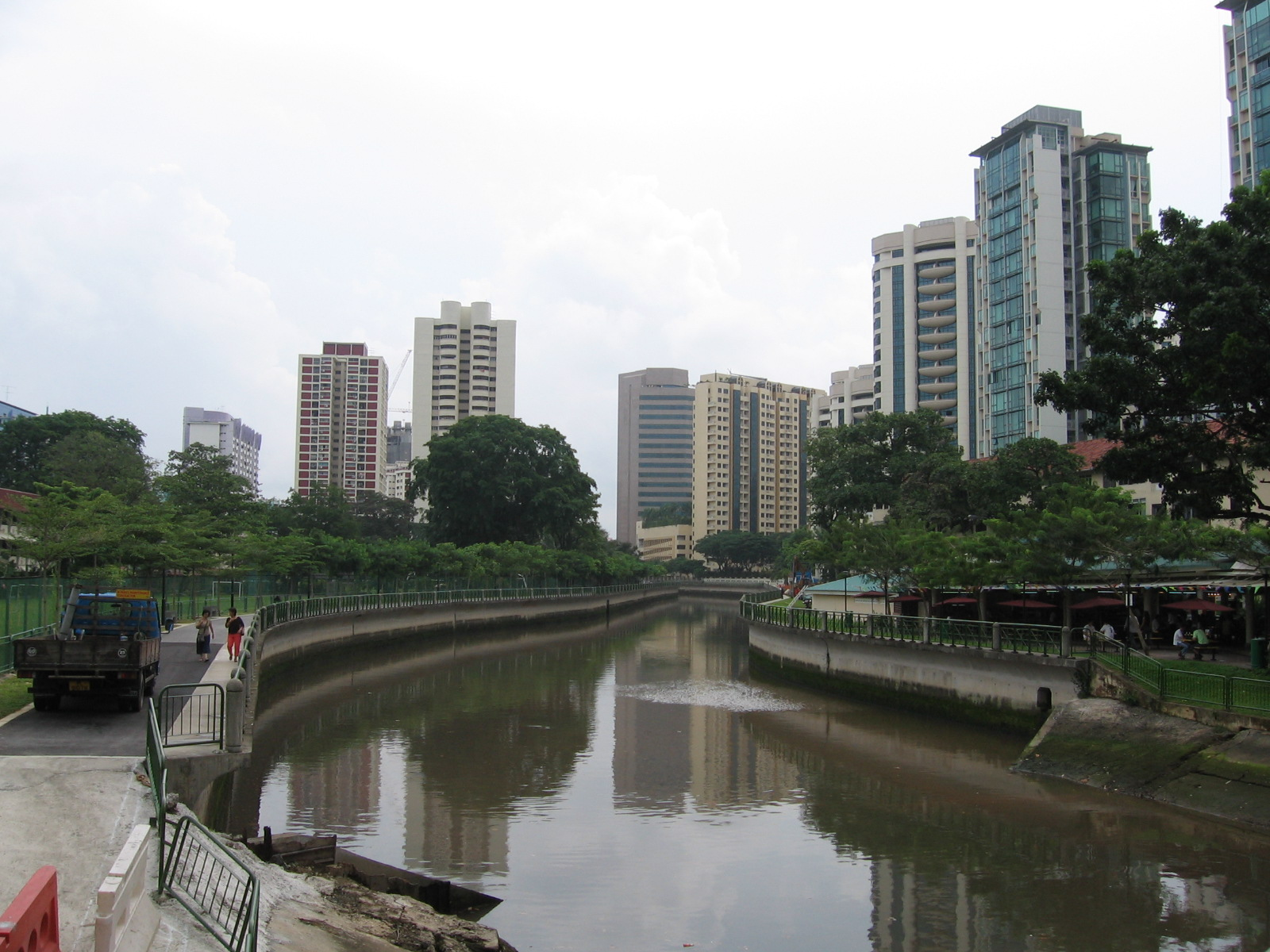
Alexandra Canal in 2006

Alexandra Canal is a 1.2-kilometer long functional and concrete canal in Singapore which stretches from Tanglin Road to Delta Road and Prince Charles Crescent. The canal has been converted into a recreational destination as a part of the Active, Beautiful and Clean (ABC) Water Programme undertaken by the Public Utilities Board of Singapore.

== History ==
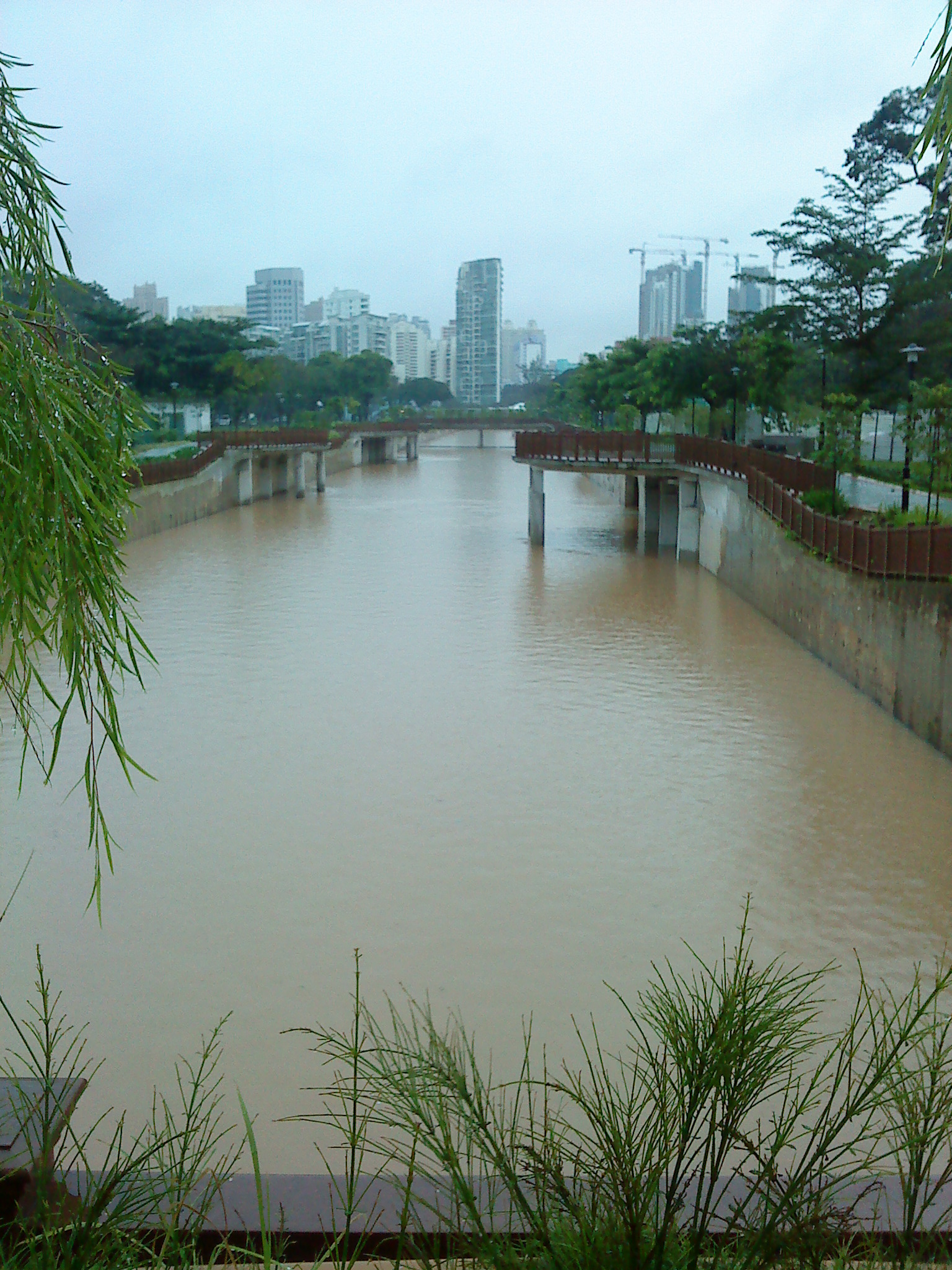
Alexandra Canal

Alexandra Canal is one of the upper reaches of the Singapore River and Sungei Pandan, becoming the Singapore River after Kim Seng Bridge. The 1.2 km long canal stretches from Tanglin Road to Delta Road. Reconstruction of Alexandra Canal between Tanglin Road and Kim Seng Road took place from 1997 to 2008 to improve the structural condition of the canal and to alleviate flooding in the catchment. In 2011, a 250-metre stretch of Alexandra Canal, between Zion Road and Kim Seng Road, was reconstructed to improve drainage and prevent floods. A 200m stretch of the open waterway near Tanglin Road was decked over to create a water cascade and water play area. The deck also provides a point from which the public can have a view of the waterway downstream.

== Educational Hut ==
The Educational Hut's information panels were developed by students from the Digital Art and Manga Club of Crescent Girls' School (CGS) in collaboration with the PUB. These panels touch on water-related topics such as the Four National Taps and ABC Waters Programme, and highlight the importance of keeping waterways clean.

== Wetlands ==
One of the ABC Waters design features at Alexandra Canal is the series of wetland systems and plants. These wetland plants are located at the decked-over stretch of the canal near Tanglin Road. Water is pumped from the canal into the wetlands, where sediments, nutrients and other impurities are removed through the plants and filter media. The treated clean water is then channelled to the rockscape garden and back into the canal, eventually ending up in Marina Reservoir. The wetland plants also beautify the landscape, and serve as a natural habitat for fishes, dragonflies and other wildlife.

== Rain Gardens and Bioretention Swales ==
At Alexandra Canal, rainwater from the nearby paved areas like footpaths gets channelled into the rain garden. Impurities in the rainwater are removed when it passes through the plants and the soil. The filtered water flows into Alexandra Canal, eventually ending up in Marina Reservoir.

Bioretention swales are drains planted with plants which will filter and channel rainwater into the underground drainage system. The plants and soil layers in the swale act as a natural filter to sieve out impurities so that clean water flows into the waterway.

== Adopters' Activities ==
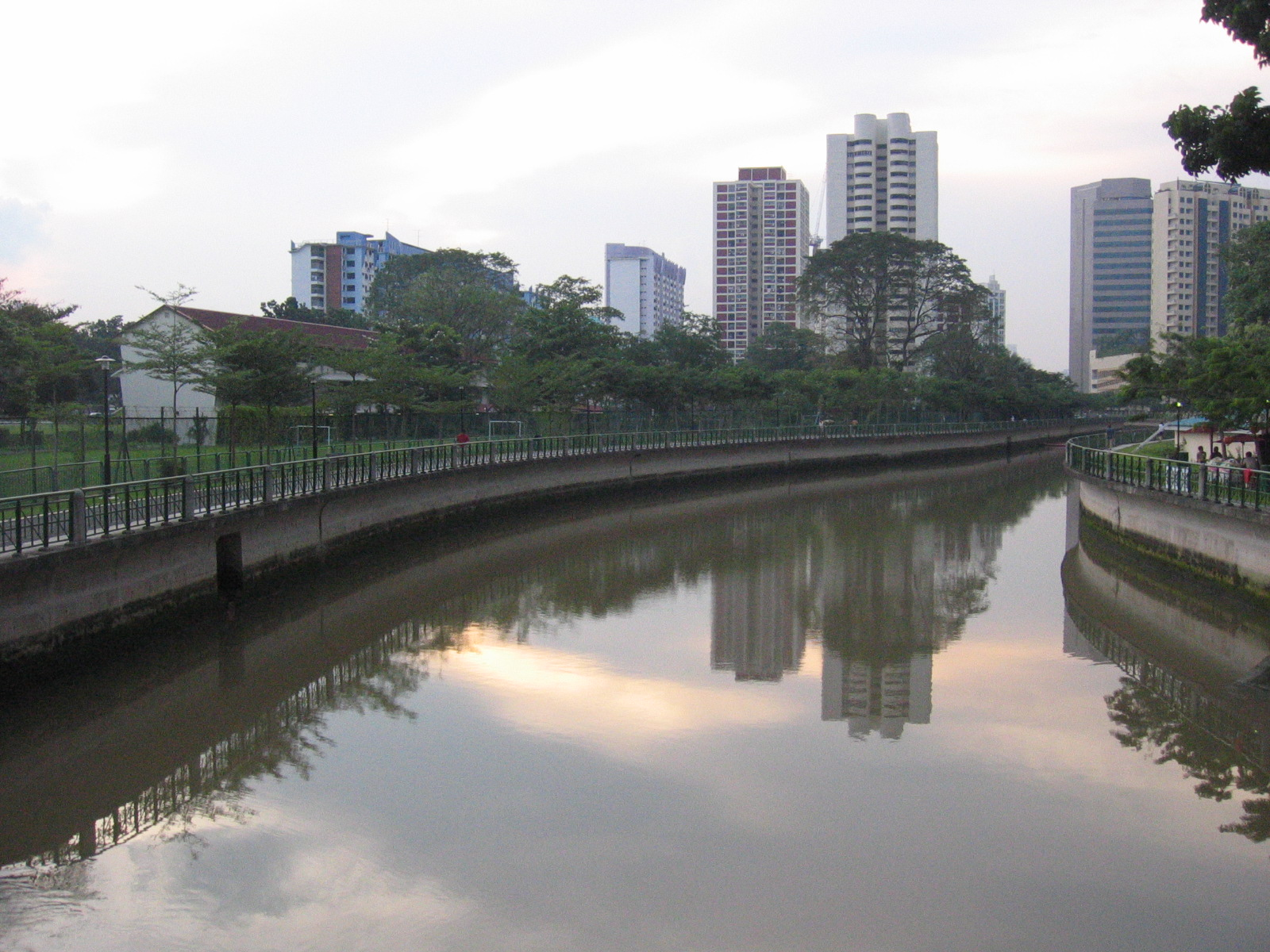
Alexandra Canal, Singapore

Adopters' Activities Students from CHIJ Kellock Primary School and Crescent Girls School got their hands dirty for a good cause in Jan 2011 where they got together with the community to do wetland planting at Alexandra Canal as part of a pre-launch of the Active, Beautiful and Clean Waters (ABC Waters) Programme. Adopters' Activities Crescent Girls Secondary School created a wireless learning trail compatible with iPhone and iPad, targeted at upper primary school students and lower secondary school students in 2011. Subsequently, Crescent Girls' trained a group of student facilitators who conducted the trail for students from other schools and the community during World Water Day 2012 and Singapore International Water Week Water Showcases 2012.
