= New Paper Big Walk =

Singaporean walking event

The New Paper Big Walk was a mass-participation walking event held annually in Singapore from 1991 to 2016. It holds the official Guinness World Record as world's largest walk when 77,500 walkers participated on 21 May 2000 at the Singapore National Stadium.

The 10-kilometre walk takes an estimated 3 hours to complete and usually starts from its traditional starting point, Singapore National Stadium at 6 o'clock in the morning.

== History ==
The event was founded by The New Paper. The first Big Walk was held on 16 June 1991 at the National Stadium. On its 10th anniversary, The New Paper Big Walk 2000 achieved the record of the World's Largest Walk.

The event took a one-year hiatus in 2007 due to discussions over venue locations.

As part of Singapore's SG50 celebrations of its 50th year of independence, the Big Walk was named the SG50 Jubilee Big Walk and the route went through part of the Jubilee Walk, an eight-kilometre commemorative trail within the Civic District and Marina Bay precinct.

== Locations ==
The Singapore National Stadium was the venue from 1991 to 2008. Afterwards, the walk was relocated to Marina Bay and renamed The Big Walk on Water.
