= List of festivals in Singapore =

List of Singapore festivals contains:

== Annual festivals ==
- IndigNation, month-long lesbian, gay, bisexual, and queer pride season
- Pink Dot SG, LGBTQ+ event in Singapore
- The Purple Parade, event for the inclusion of people with special needs

== Religious ==
Buddhist

Festival	Date	Status	Ethnic Group
Hungry Ghost Festival	August/September	Domestic	Chinese
Vesak	Full moon day of the month of Vaisakha	Domestic	Chinese, Indian

Christian

Festival	Date	Status
New Year's Day	1 January	Domestic
Good Friday	The Friday preceding Easter Sunday	Domestic
Easter		Domestic
Christmas Eve	24 December	Domestic
Christmas Day	25 December	Domestic

Hindu

Festival	Date	Status	Ethnic Group
Thaipusam	mid-January to mid-February	Domestic	Indian and Tamil
Deepavali		Domestic	Indian and Tamil

Muslim

Festival	Date	Status	Ethnic Group
Hari Raya Puasa	1 Syawal	Domestic	Malay
Hari Raya Haji	10 Zulhijjah	Domestic	Malay

Taoist

Festival	Date	Status	Ethnic Group
Hungry Ghost Festival	August/September	Domestic	Chinese
Nine Emperor Gods Festival	September/October	Domestic	Chinese

== Traditional ==
Festival	Date	Status	Ethnic Group
Chinese New Year's Eve	January/February	Domestic	Chinese
Chinese New Year	January/February	Domestic	Chinese
Lantern Festival	January/February	Domestic	Chinese
Qing Ming Festival	April	Domestic	Chinese
Duanwu Festival / Dragon Boat Festival	June	Domestic	Chinese
Qixi Festiva	August	Domestic	Chinese
Mid-Autumn Festival / Mooncake Festival	September/October	Domestic	Chinese
Double Ninth Festival	9th day of the 9th lunar month	Domestic	Chinese
Dōngzhì Festival / Winter Solstice Festival	December	Domestic	Chinese

== Arts ==
- Asia Fashion Exchange
- Asian Festival of Children's Content
- Audi Fashion Festival Singapore / Singapore Fashion Week
- i Light Marina Bay
- EarthFest Singapore
- Singapore International Festival of Arts
- Singapore Fireworks Celebrations
- Singapore Food Festival
- Singapore Garden Festival
- Singapore International Photography Festival
- Singapore's iPhone film festival
- Singapore River Festival
- Singapore Writers Festival
- Singapore Youth Festival

=== Film festivals ===
- Animation Nation
- Asian Festival of First Films
- Screen Singapore
- Singapore International Film Festival
- Japanese Film Festival
- World Film Carnival Singapore

=== Music festivals ===
- Baybeats
- EarthFest Singapore
- Festival of Praise
- Laneway Festival
- Mosaic Music Festival
- Singapore Sun Festival
- Singfest
- Ultra Singapore
- ZoukOut

== Sports ==
SEA Games host nation

- 1973 SEAP Games
- 1983 SEA Games
- 1993 SEA Games
- 2015 SEA Games

== See also ==
- Culture of Singapore
- Cinema of Singapore
- Music of Singapore
- Sport in Singapore
