= CORENA =

Citizens Own Renewable Energy Network Australia Inc.

CORENA is an abbreviation of "Citizens [ sic ] Own Renewable Energy Network Australia Incorporated", an Australian nonprofit organisation based in Modbury, South Australia that relies on voluntary contributions from the public to fund practical renewable energy projects.

== History ==
The concept was inspired by a conversation between founder Margaret Hender and a relative, wherein they discussed the possibility of Australia becoming powered entirely by renewable energy. A study published by Beyond Zero Emissions established that the goal was achievable if each household contributed $8 per week over 10 years. Thus CORENA was established to act as a focal point for the community desire to participate in such a scheme.

CORENA was incorporated on 22 April 2013.

=== Name ===
The lack of an apostrophe in the official title of the organisation stems from the requirement that the name of a financial institution account needs to exactly match the name of an organisation as it appears in its incorporation documents. Furthermore, the account name input fields of financial institutions don't accept the apostrophe as a valid character, causing deposits to bounce if the entered name does not match the account name. Hence for practical reasons the apostrophe remains omitted in spite of the grammatical error.

== Projects ==
=== Big Win Project ===
The first Big Win project aims to collect AU$5 million initially, with the aim of using this money to enable the first stage of building a 50 MegaWatt solar thermal and storage plant, including planning, the purchase of land and auxiliary power.

=== Quick Win Projects ===
CORENA also co-ordinates a series of Quick Win projects that provide interest-free loans, consisting of money collected through donations, to nonprofit community groups to install solar power or solar hot water systems and/or for energy efficiency measures.
