= The Transition Decade =

Environmental campaign

Transition Decade logo

The Transition Decade is a non-partisan shared campaign which is coordinated by an alliance of Australian community, social, and environmental groups, non-profits and NGOs. The initiative forms a unified plan to campaign, lobby and work to restore safe climate conditions and a sustainable future.

The initiative emerged from the Victorian sustainability movement and expanded to encompass the rest of Australia. Organisations and community groups involved include; Friends of the Earth, Beyond Zero Emissions, Climate Emergency Network, Sustainable Living Foundation, Transition Network, Australian Youth Climate Coalition, Yarra Climate Action Now, Darebin Climate Action Now, Climate Action Moreland, Sustainable Living Tasmania, Environment Victoria, Alternative Technology Association and 100% Renewable campaign.

A number of organisations have been advocating for and working in a ten-year time frame, the Transition Decade initiative integrates this work to strengthen resources and to connect movements that are influencing policy and local action.

== History ==
The Transition Decade was inspired by many initiatives including:

- Lester Brown first promoted the idea of a transition decade in 1990. State of the World. (Worldwatch Institute). New York: W.W. Norton. (p. 174)
- Al Gore adopted a 10-year timeframe for the Repower America Renewables Program.
- Beyond Zero Emissions are developing the Zero Carbon Australia plan. Supported by the Climate Emergency Network
- Zero emissions by 2020 is policy for some Victorian local councils; City of Melbourne, Maribyrnong City Council, Moreland City Council, Darebin City Council, Central Victorian Greenhouse Alliance and the Western Alliance for Greenhouse Action.
- Australian climate action groups adopted 100% renewables by 2020 at the National Action Climate Summit in 2009.
- Australian Greens, The Greens' Safe Climate Bill
- Safe Climate theme adopted by Environment Victoria, and a growing number of climate action groups.
- State of the World Forum adopted a 10-year timeframe climate leadership program (2050 by 2020 campaign).
- Transition Town movement is spreading rapidly in Australia utilising the transition theme.

=== Launch ===
The Transition Decade was launched on 14 February 2010, in Melbourne, Victoria, Australia, at the Melbourne Town Hall, to a crowd of over 1,000 during the 2010 Sustainable Living Festival.

Speakers included; Rob Gell (Master of Ceremonies), Governor of Victoria Professor David De Kretser, Uncle Bob Randall (Yankunytjatjara elder and traditional owner of Uluru), Cam Walker (Friends of the Earth), Professor Rob Adams (Director Design & Urban Environment City of Melbourne), Professor Will Steffen (Executive Director of the ANU Climate Institute), Senator Christine Milne (Deputy Leader of the Australian Greens), Kelly O'Shanassy (Chief Executive Environment Victoria), Giselle Wilkinson (President of the Sustainable Living Foundation), Philip Sutton (Convener of The Climate Emergency Network), and Mark Ogge (Beyond Zero Emissions).

== Timeline ==
=== 2010 onwards ===
From 2010: Community Commitment - Getting Whole Communities to YES

Activate Transition Advocates - This phase will see organisations working together and sharing resources to build the capacity to promote the Transition Decade concept on a mass scale. A growing alliance of climate focused individuals and organisations will generate a level of social approval throughout communities across Australia of the Transition Decade goals. This task can not be achieved by a small group of organisations. The alliance will gather and share tools support to individuals and organisations across sectors to get to YES on the goals to restore a safe climate.

Social Mobilisation - Creating mass 'social will' to adopt a transition decade target was envisioned as a vital stage in achieving the goals of the Transition Decade vision, with extensive and creative approaches to attract people to support the vision.

When a significant proportion of the community accepts the climate emergency, we can build the political will to enable governments and business to respond to the shared goals of the Transition Decade. Our political leaders need to hear a clear message from the community that we must invest in policies and projects to achieve a social and structural transition.

=== 2012 onwards ===
From 2012: Government Commitment

Policy Reform - Major changes to existing policy and the formulation of new legislation will be necessary to provide a framework for new economic development and innovation.

=== 2014 onwards ===
From 2014: Intense Transition Mode

Economic Reorientation - Shifts in the current economic system will be vital in providing the stimulus and capacity for the design, construction and production of necessary systems, services and goods.

Given the huge scale of what needs to be done to restore a safe climate, it will be impossible to get everything done in a decade, or even two decades, if we continue to approach the transition in a business-as-usual way.

It will take a determined effort from all levels of the community to remain committed to effective action until the task is completed.

== Initiatives, plans, proposals ==
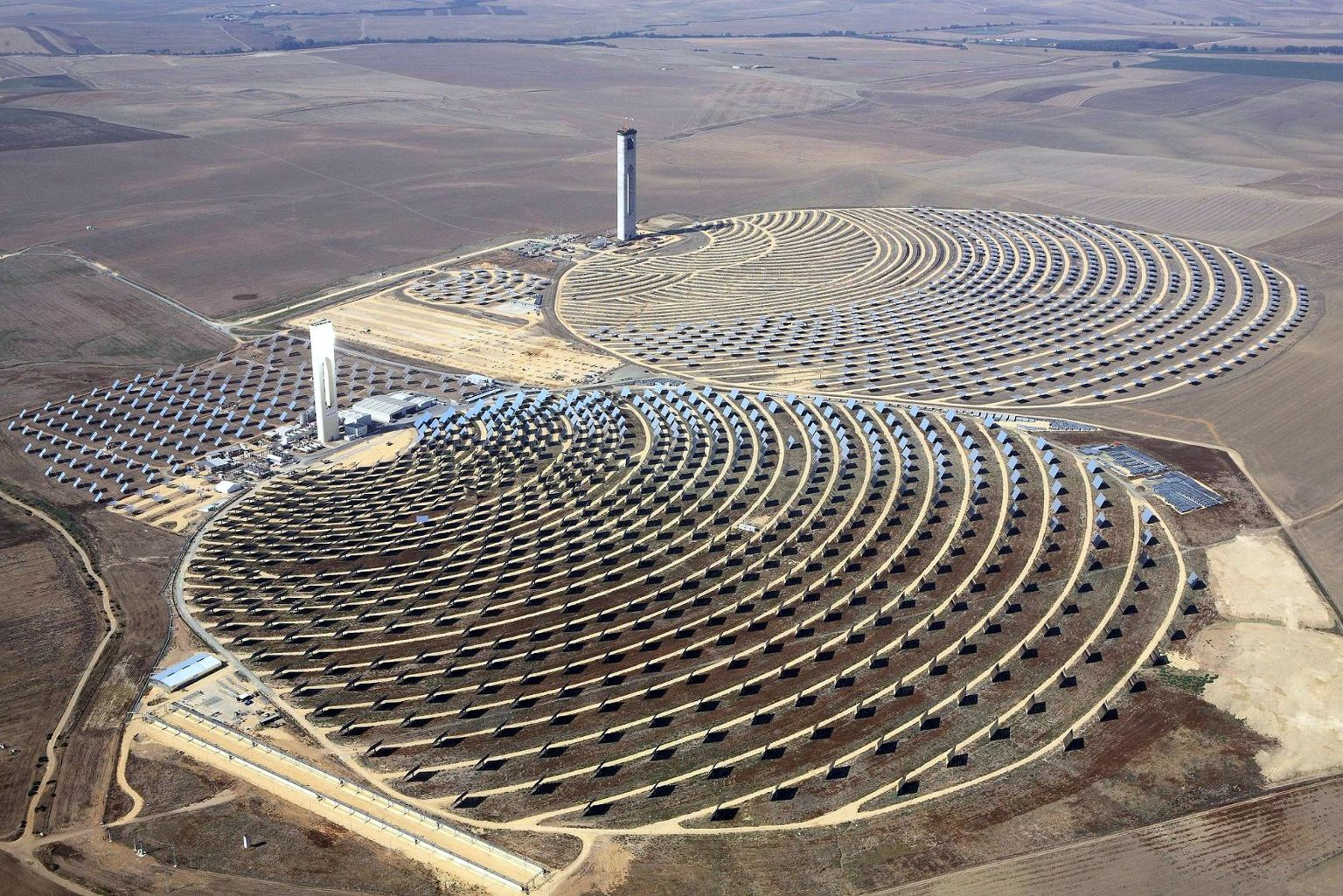
PS20 & PS10 in Spain, example of solar thermal technology proposed to be adopted in Australia's renewable energy transition.

=== Strategies ===
- Drive greenhouse gas emissions to (net) zero below the level of natural sequestration of GHG
- Draw down excess atmospheric carbon dioxide from the air and store it safely
- If warranted, directly reduce the Earth's temperature, until the first two strategies have restored a safe climate

=== Intended outcomes ===
- Concentrated investment and development in renewable energy systems
- Elimination of harmful waste
- Efficient use of resources
- Ecological conservation and restoration

== Associated resources ==
- Beyond Zero Emissions - Zero Carbon Australia 2020
- Safe Climate Australia - Transition Plan
- Mark Z Jacobson - Scientific American Repowering a green planet
- Zero Carbon Britain - Zero Carbon Britain Plan
- Repower America - Repower America
