= BZE =

BZE may refer to:

- Belize, UNDP country code
- Beyond Zero Emissions, an Australian-based, not-for-profit climate change solutions think-tank
- Philip S. W. Goldson International Airport, the largest airport in Belize
- Benzoylecgonine, a drug metabolite
