= 3CR =

3CR may refer to:

- 3CR (Melbourne), a community radio station, broadcasting on the AM band in Melbourne, Australia
- 3 Colours Red, a hard rock band
- BBC Three Counties Radio, a local radio station in England
- Third Cambridge Catalogue of Radio Sources, the revised third Cambridge catalogue of astronomical radio sources
