= EarthFest Singapore =

Sustainability Festival

Coordinates: 1°16′46.124″N 103°52′16.26″E

EarthFest Singapore (games)
- Host city: Singapore
- Opening: 26 September 2015
- Closing: 26 September 2015
- Website: Official Website

EarthFest Singapore (music festival)
- Dates: 26 September 2015
- Locations: Marina Barrage, Singapore
- Years active: 2015- present
- Founders: Michael Broadhead
- Website: Official Website

EarthFest Singapore
- Genre: Food festival, Music festival and Edutainment festival
- Dates: 1 day, ending second last weekend of September
- Locations: Marina Barrage, Singapore
- Years active: 11
- Website: Official Website

EarthFest Singapore is a comprehensive festival celebrating sustainability in Singapore by the Centre for Responsible Future and first took place on 26 September 2015. The second festival occurred on 12 February 2017.

The event is a collaboration between many different businesses and organisations in Singapore with the purpose of encouraging sustainability. The event has components of a food festival - as an international food fair of foods with lower environmental footprints, a farmer's market and bazaar, and a music festival which features live music from local talent, edutainment is covered with a carnival with environmentally themed educational games.

EarthFest also screens documentaries and has talks about sustainability topics given by various experts in Singapore. It is a low-waste festival, incorporating elements of the circular and sharing economies.

== History ==
Michael Broadhead is the volunteer director of the festival. The event is in collaboration with Marina Barrage.

== Venue ==
The festival at Marina Barrage is accessible via Circle MRT line or Downtown MRT line via Bayfront MRT station, by walking and by Bicycle (parking slots available).

== See also ==
- Vegfest
- Earth Hour, Earth Day
- Shambala Festival
- The Transition Decade
- Sustainability
- Sustainable living
- Plant-based diet
