= Marina Barrage =

Tidal barrage in Singapore

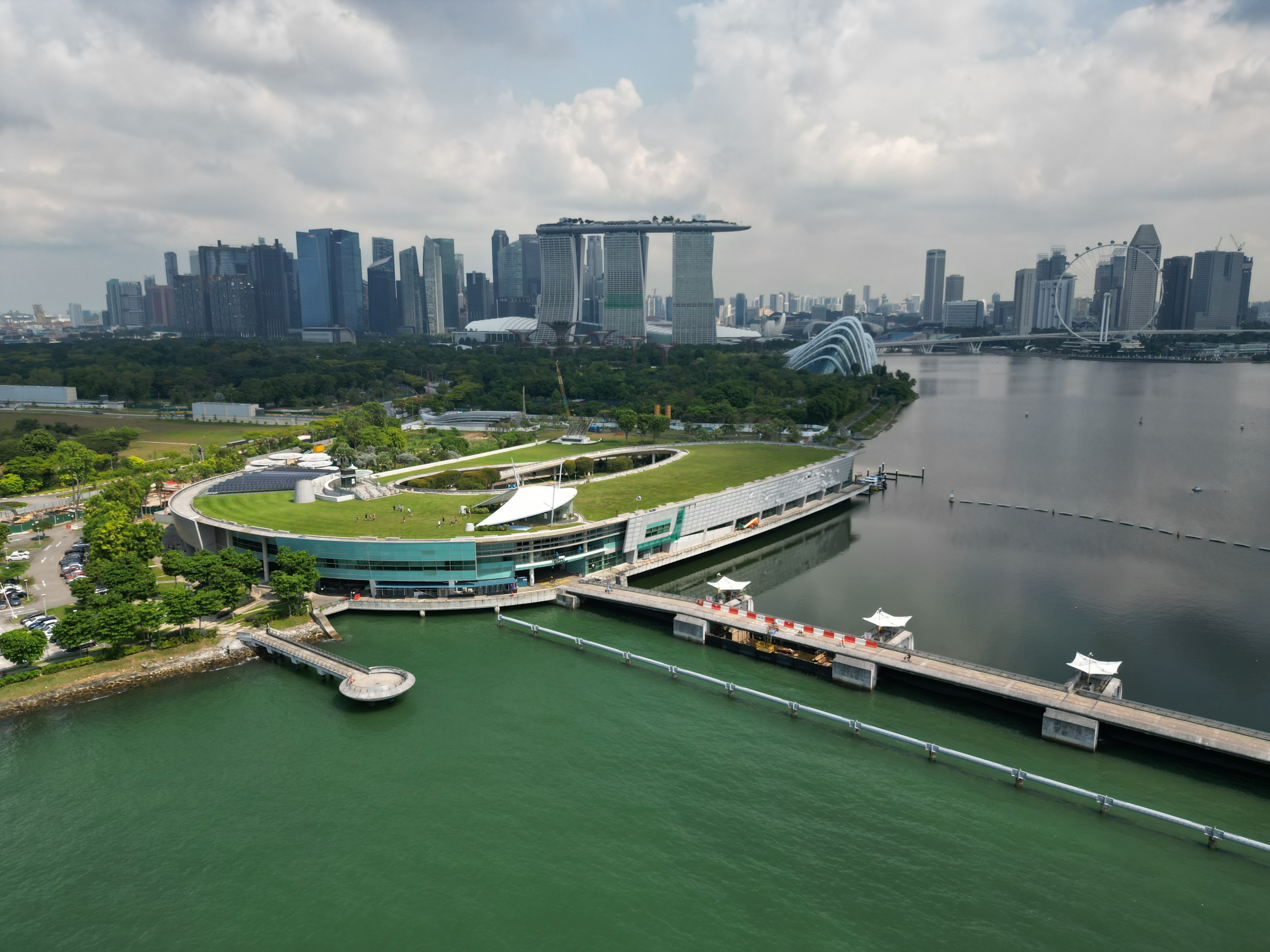
- Interactive map of Marina Barrage
- Country: Singapore
- Location: 8 Marina Gardens Drive
- Coordinates: 1°16′46.124″N 103°52′16.26″E
- Status: Operational
- Opening date: 31 October 2008; 17 years ago
- Construction cost: S$226 million

Dam and spillways
- Type of dam: Barrage
- Impounds: Marina Channel
- Length: 350 m (1,150 ft)

Reservoir
- Creates: Marina Reservoir
- Catchment area: 10,000 ha (25,000 acres)
- Surface area: 240 ha (590 acres)
- Website pub.gov.sg/marina

The Marina Barrage is a tidal barrage in southern Singapore built at the confluence of five rivers, across the Marina Channel between Marina East and Marina South.

First conceptualised in 1987 by then prime minister Lee Kuan Yew to help achieve greater self-sufficiency for the country's water needs, the barrage began construction on 22 March 2005, and was officially opened on 31 October 2008 as Singapore's fifteenth reservoir, the Marina Reservoir.

It provides water storage, flood control and recreation. It won a Superior Achievement Award from the American Academy of Environmental Engineers in 2009. It also turned the previously salt water Marina Bay into fresh water for the first time in its history.

== Purpose ==
The S$3 billion project, with $226 million for the structure itself, turned Marina Bay and Kallang Basin into a new downtown freshwater Marina Reservoir. It provides water supply and flood control, as well as being a tourist attraction.

By keeping out seawater, the barrage formed Singapore's 15th reservoir and first reservoir in the city. Marina Reservoir, together with the future Punggol and Serangoon reservoirs, increased Singapore's water catchment areas by one-sixth of Singapore's total land area.

Marina Barrage also acts as a tidal barrier to keep seawater out, helping to alleviate flooding in high-risk low-lying areas of the downtown districts such as Chinatown, Jalan Besar and Geylang.

When it rains heavily during low tide, the barrage's crest gates are lowered to release excess water from the coastal reservoir into the sea. If heavy rain falls during high tide, the crest gates remain closed and giant drainage pumps are activated to pump excess water out to sea.

As the water in the Marina Basin is unaffected by the tides, the water level is kept constant, making it ideal for recreational activities such as boating, windsurfing, kayaking and dragonboating.

== Impact ==
The building of the Marina Barrage required the relocation of Clifford Pier from Collyer Quay to Marina South (see Marina South Pier).

It has proved to be a tourist attraction. Marina Barrage is open for viewing 24/7. The information counter is open from 9.00am to 9.00pm daily. Tours for a maximum capacity of 80 people to the Visitor Centre can be arranged prior to arrival.

From 2012 to 2017, it played host to annual public youth community and cosplay event EOY Cosplay Festival.

== Awards ==
The Marina Barrage was conferred the Superior Achievement Award – the highest honour of the competition for the best project entry - at the AAEE Annual Awards Luncheon held in Washington, DC, USA on 6 May 2009. The Marina Barrage beat 33 other entries to take home the top prize in this year's competition organised by the American Academy of Environmental Engineers (AAEE), becoming the second project outside of USA to win the award, in the last decade.

== Gallery ==
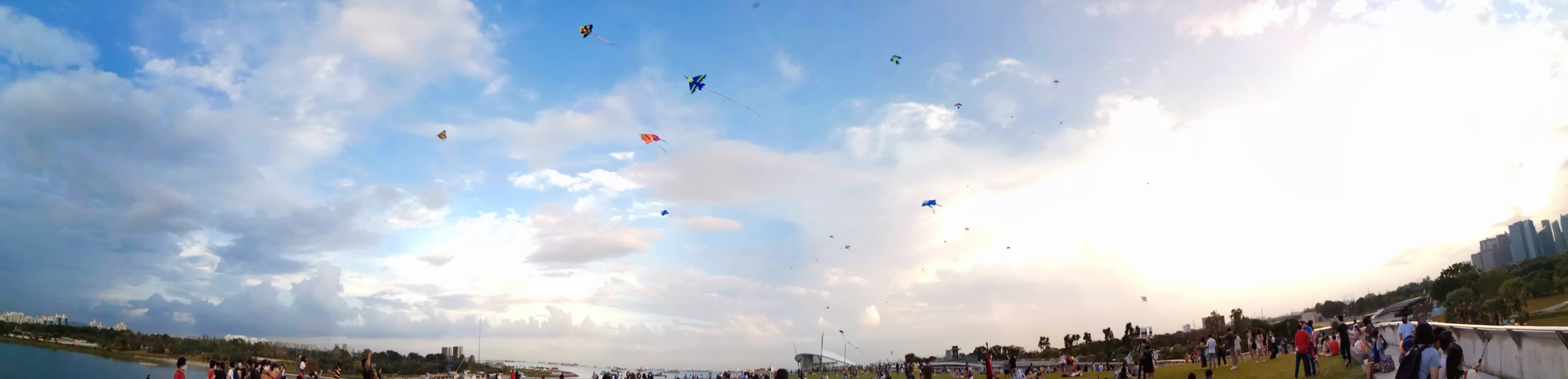
Kite-flying is a popular pastime on the barrage

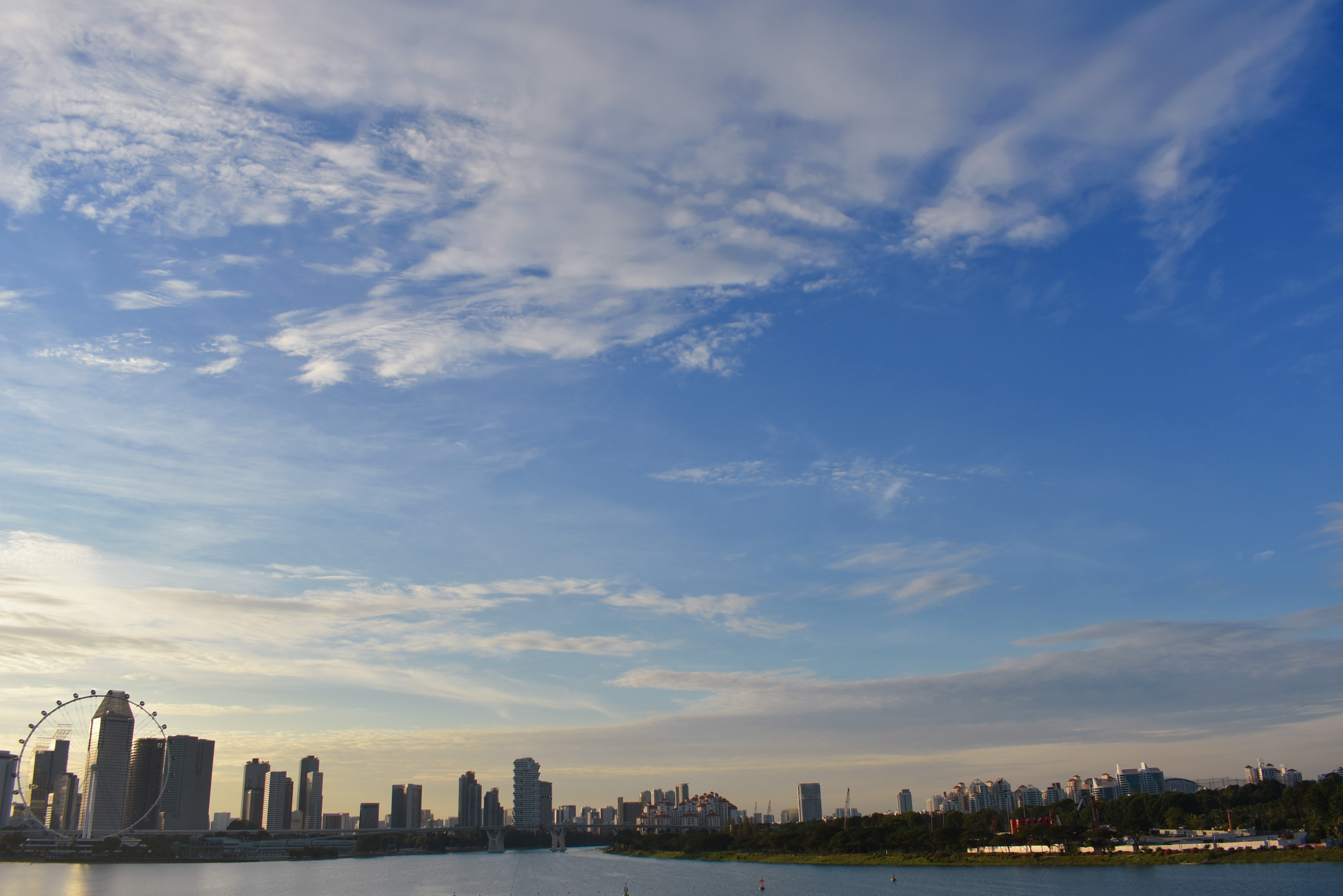
Singapore downtown skyline as seen from the Marina Barrage

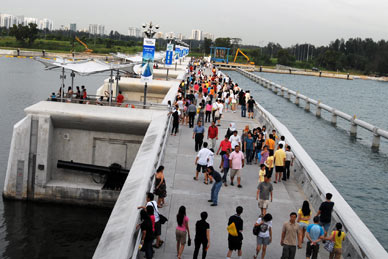
The Marina Bridge

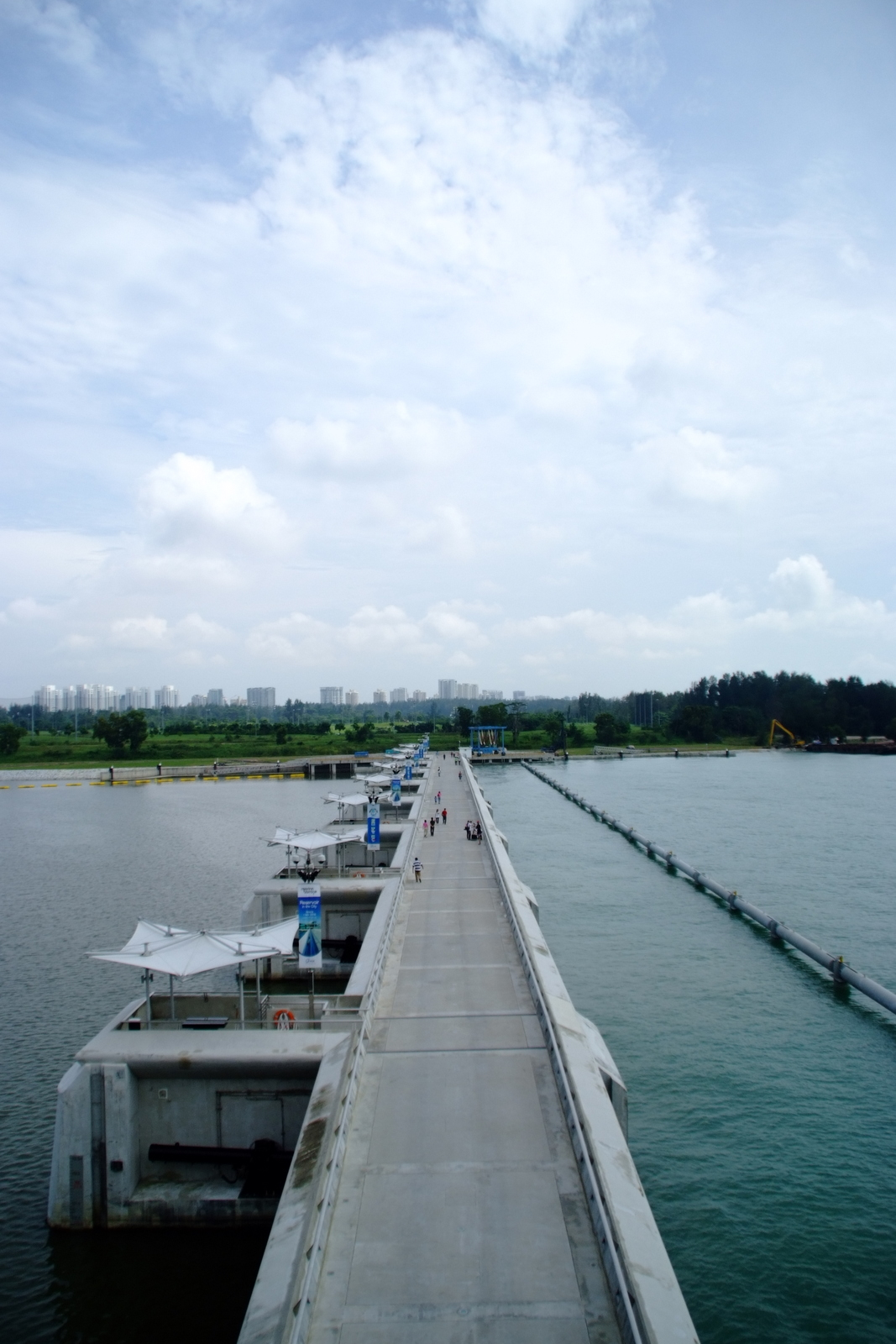
The bridge holds the press gates that control water flow

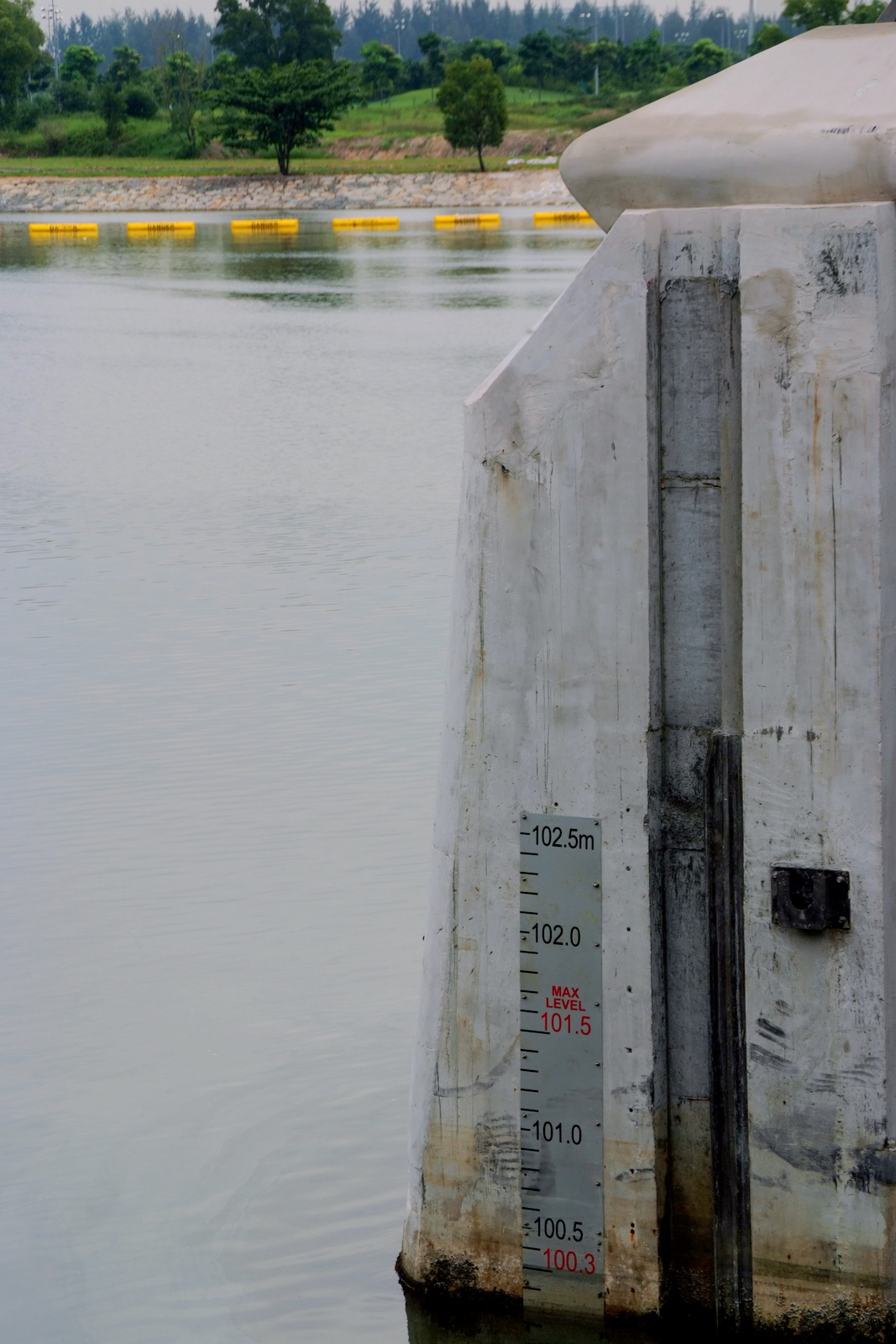
Depth markings on the observation piers

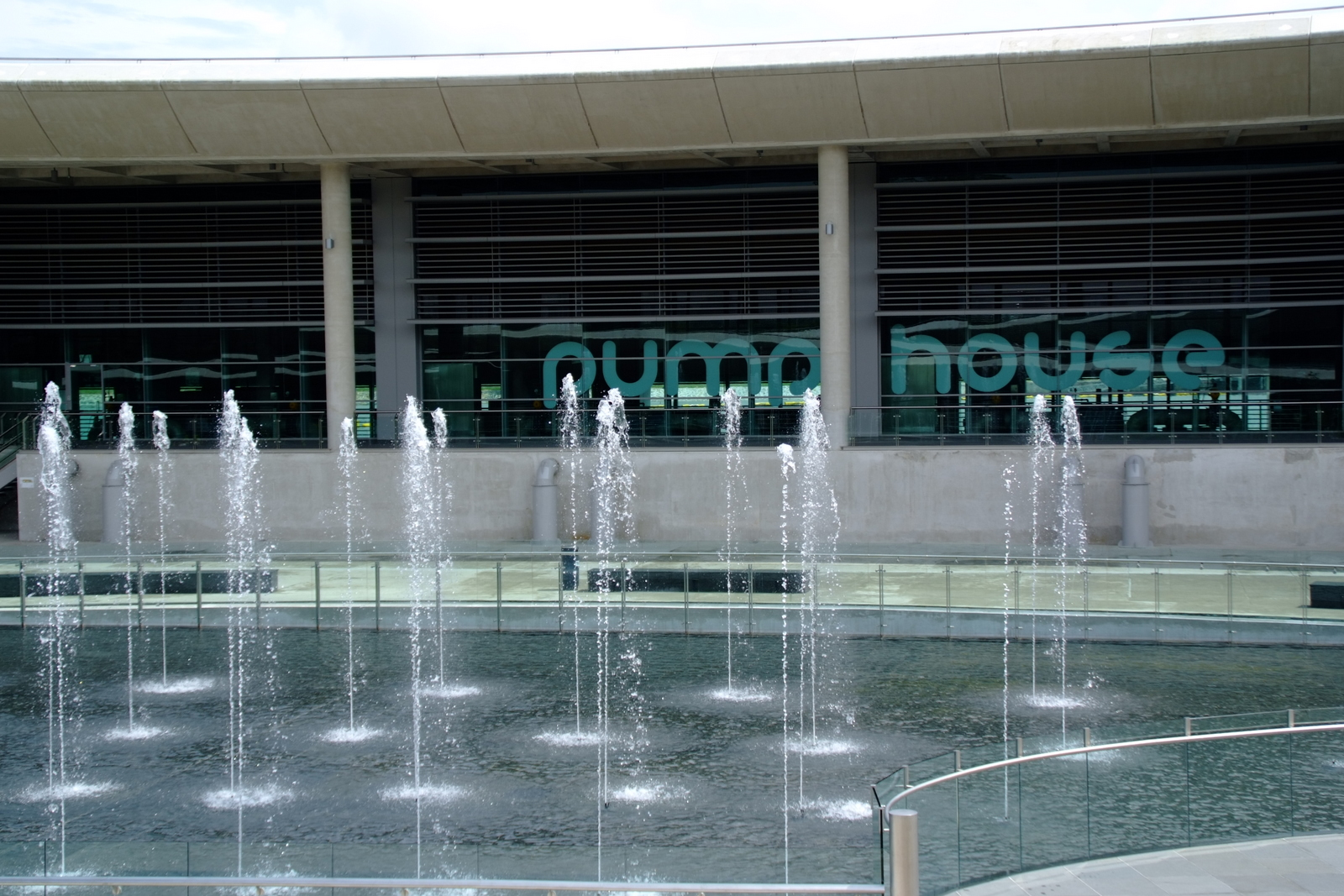
The Pump House in the background contains the seven massive water pumps

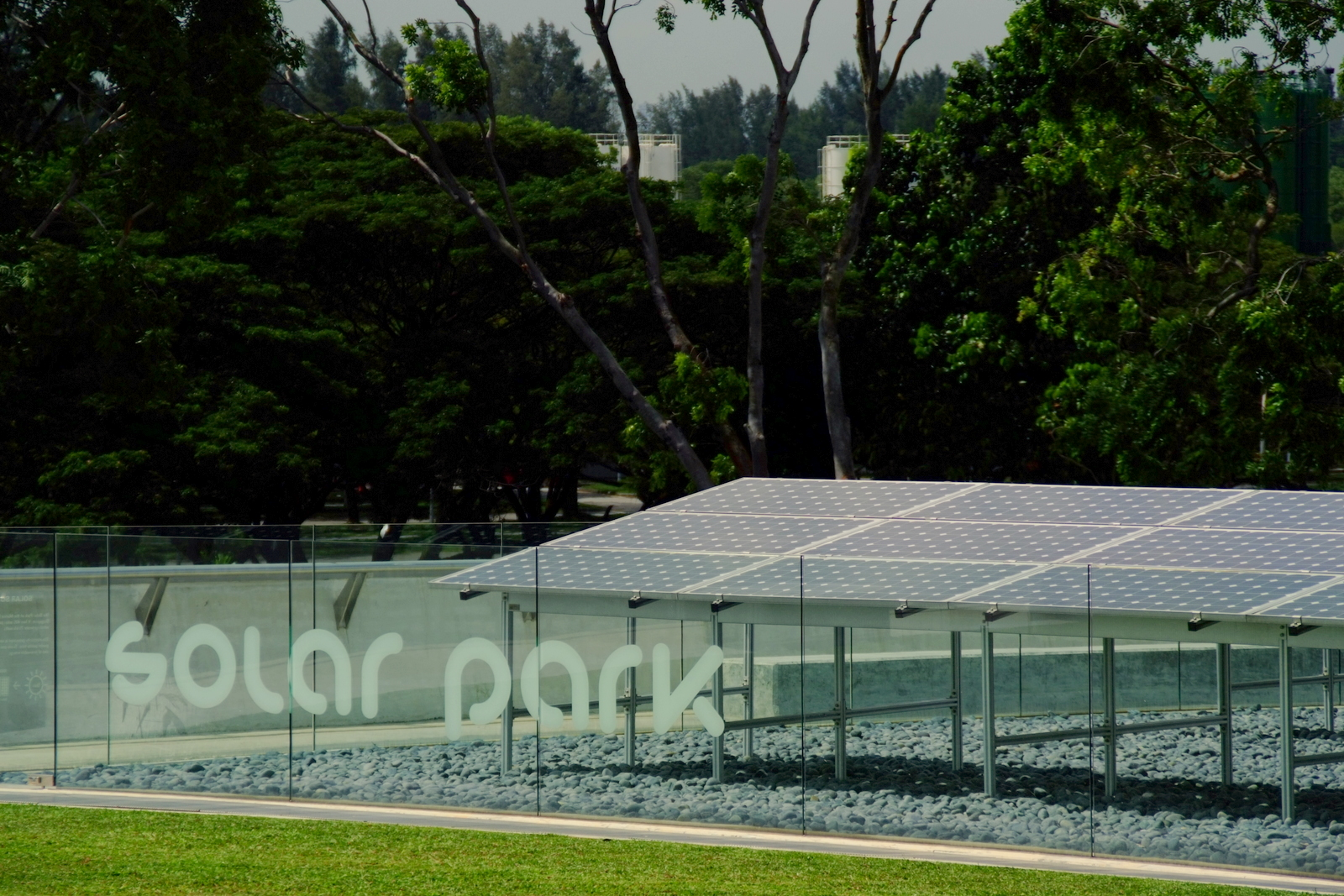
The Solar Park which provides additional electrical power for the site

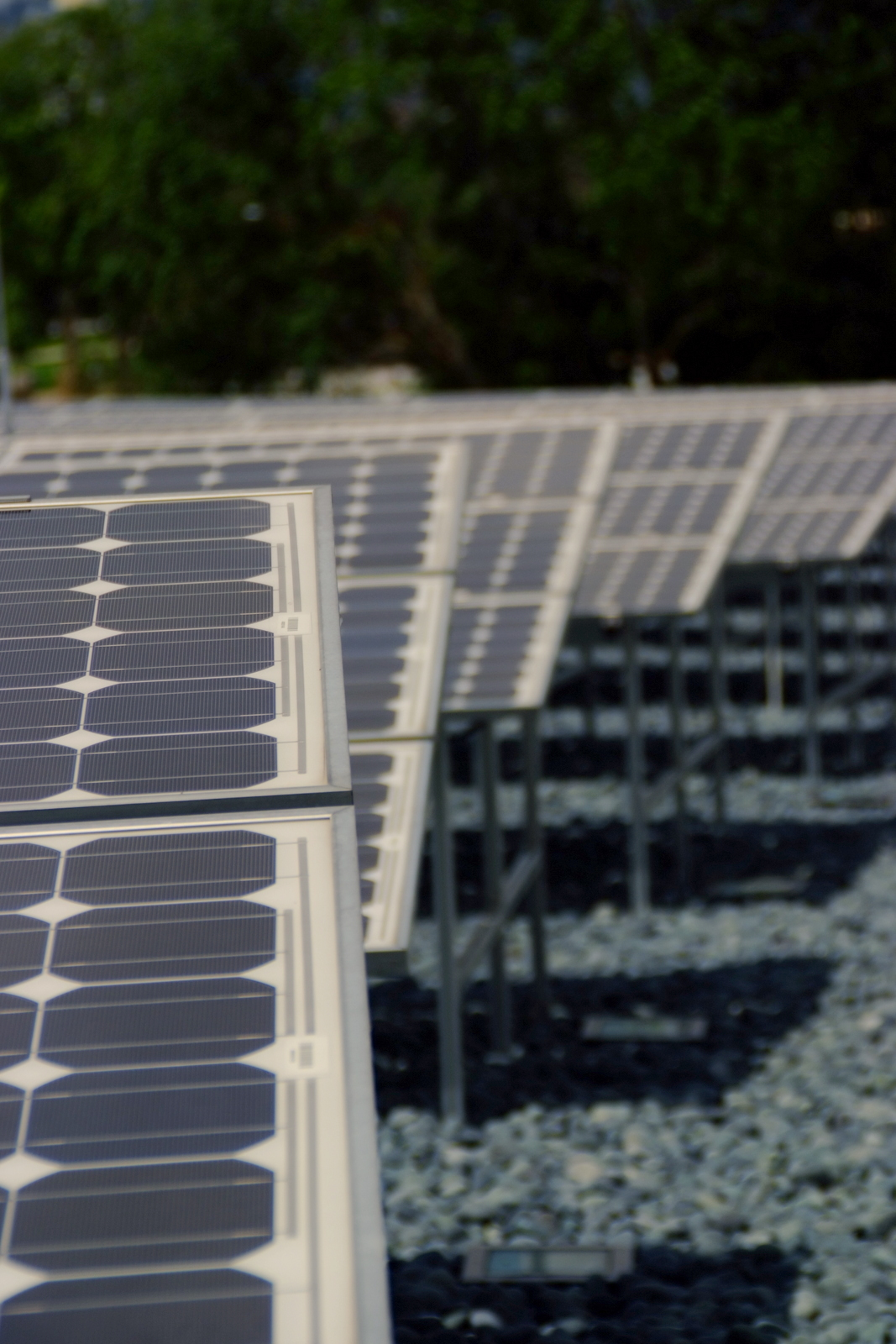
The solar panels in the Solar Park

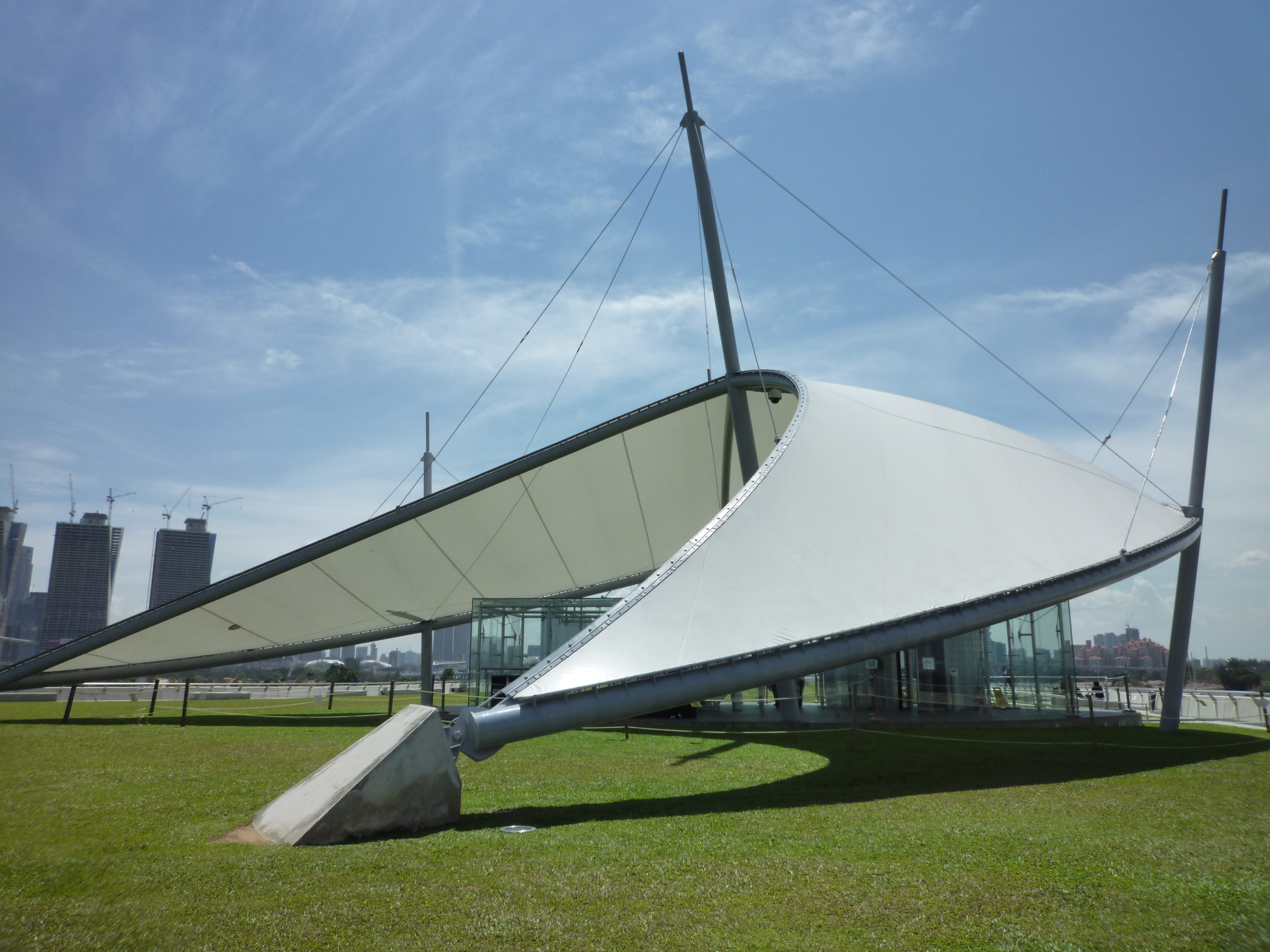
The Green Roof

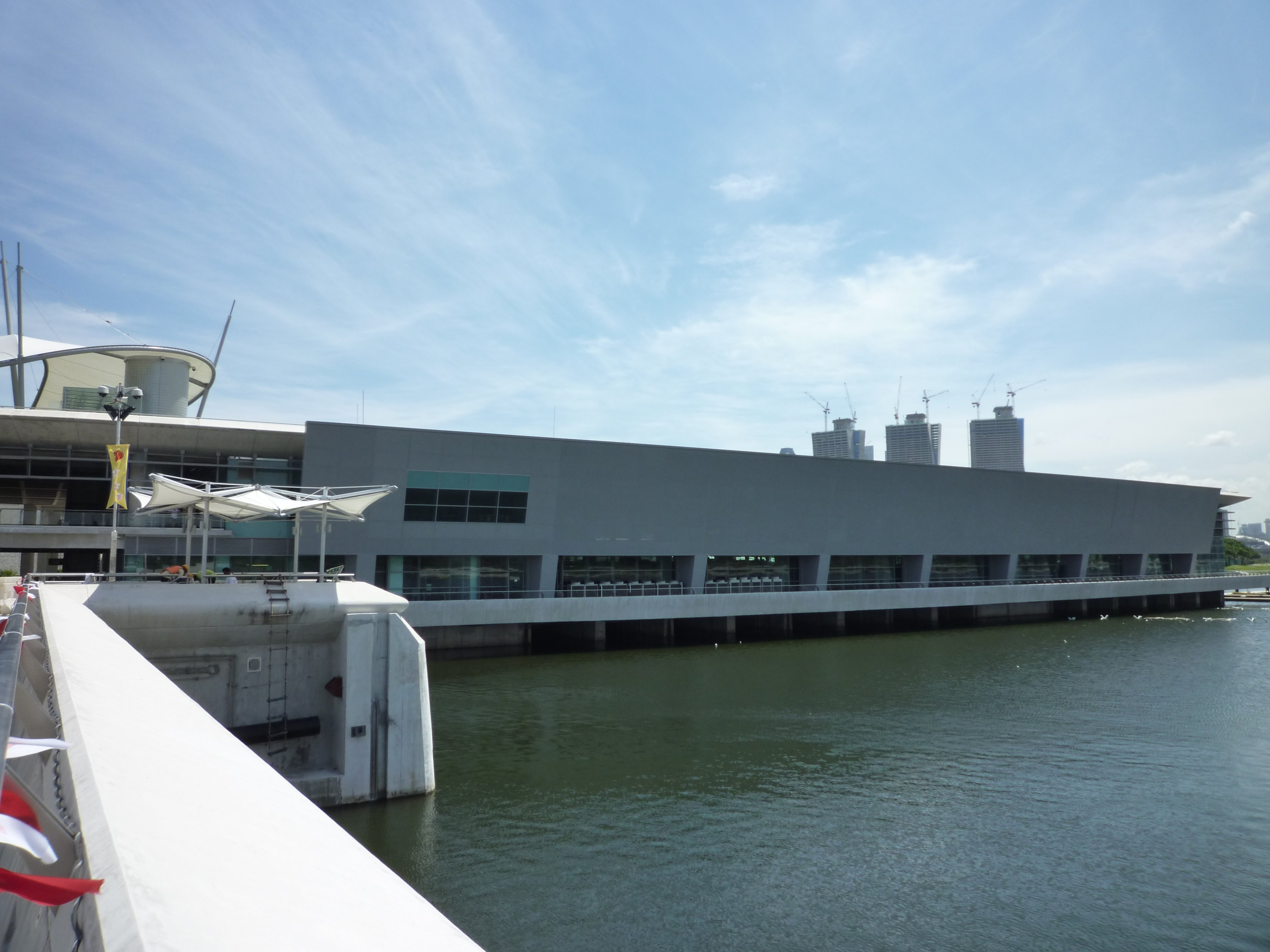
The Pump House

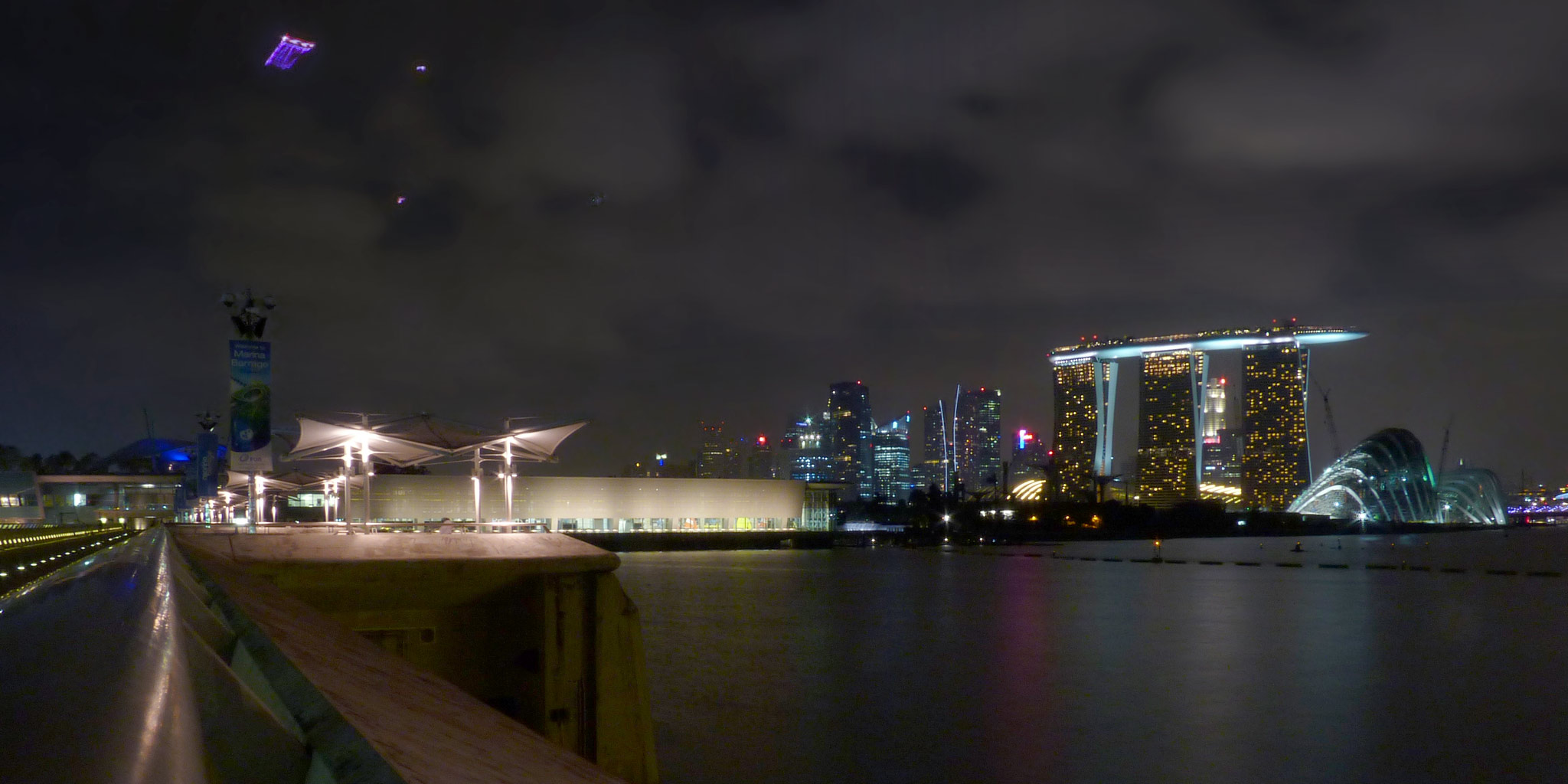
Marina Barrage viewed from its east end

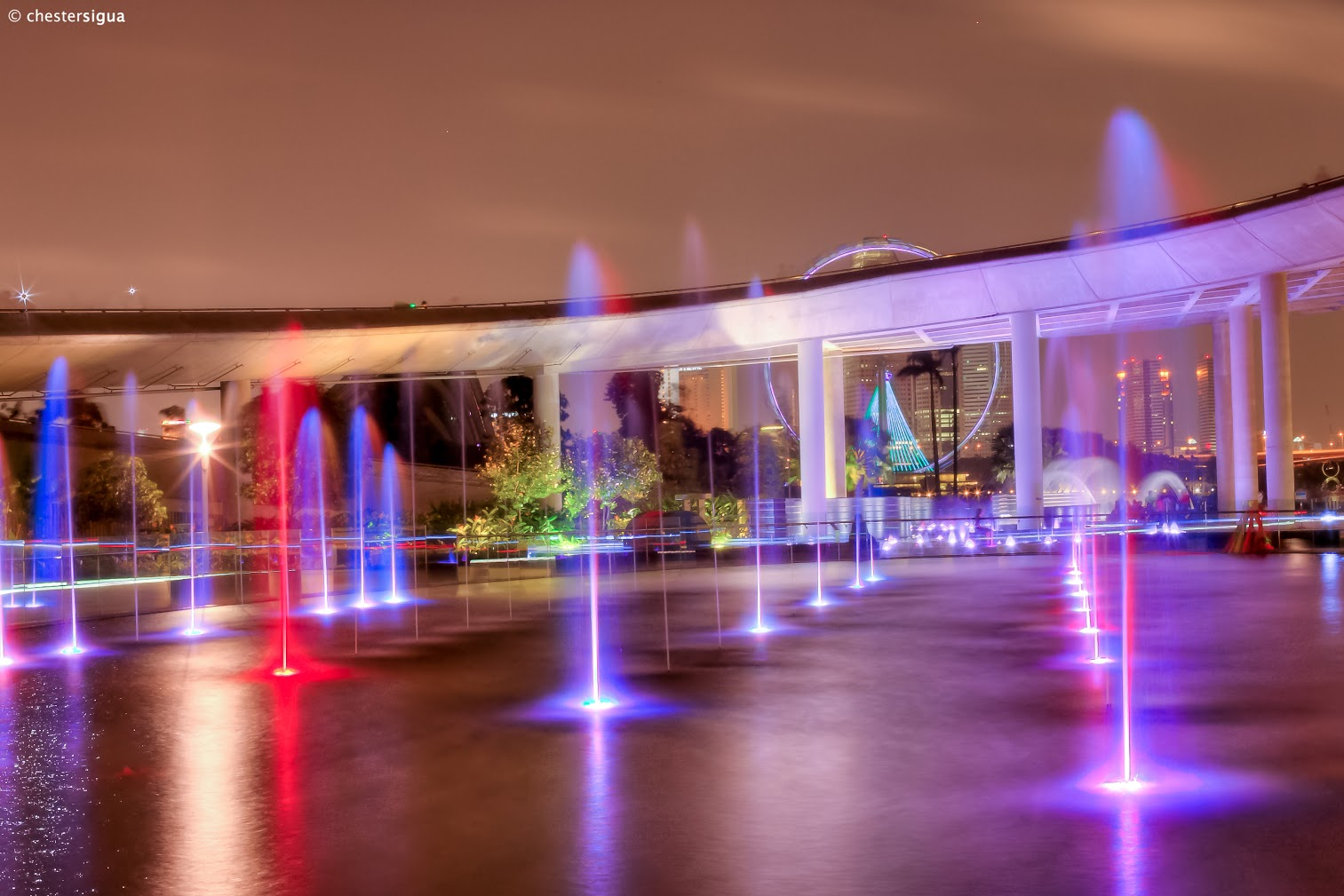
Fountains at the Marina Barrage

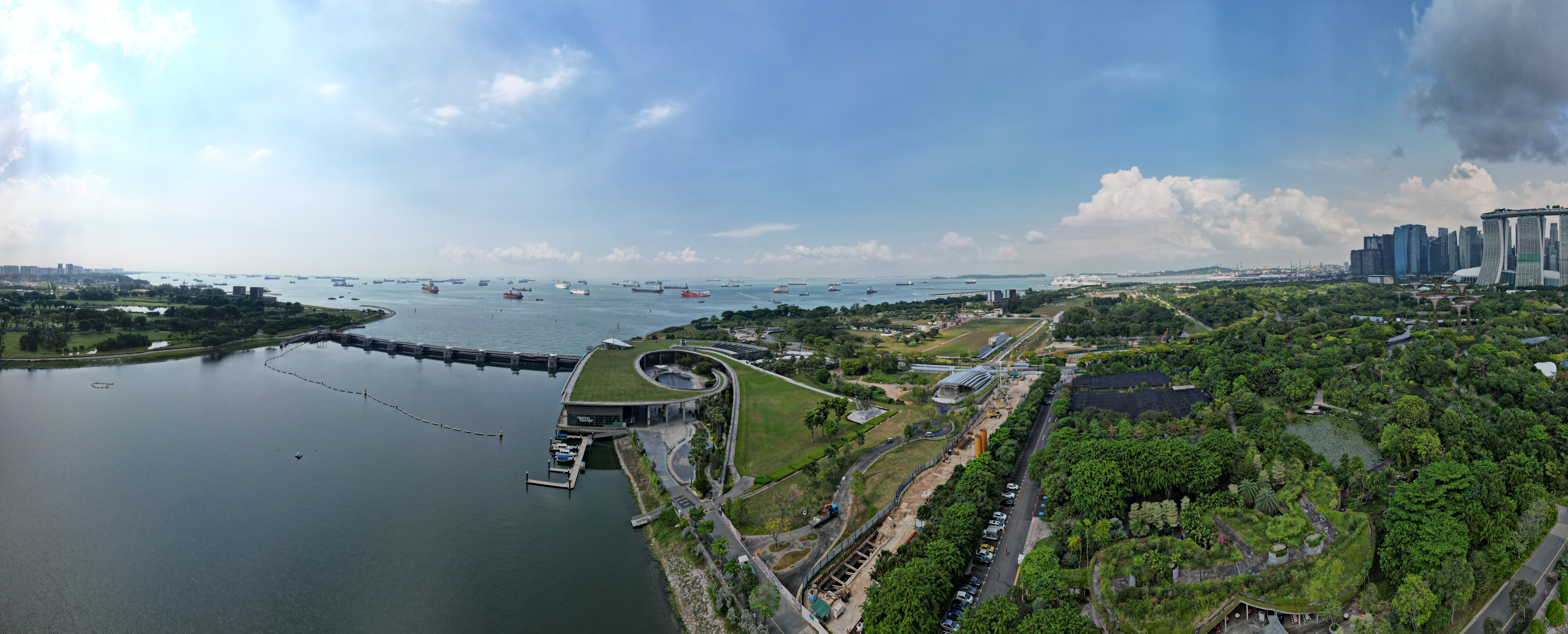
Marina Barrage

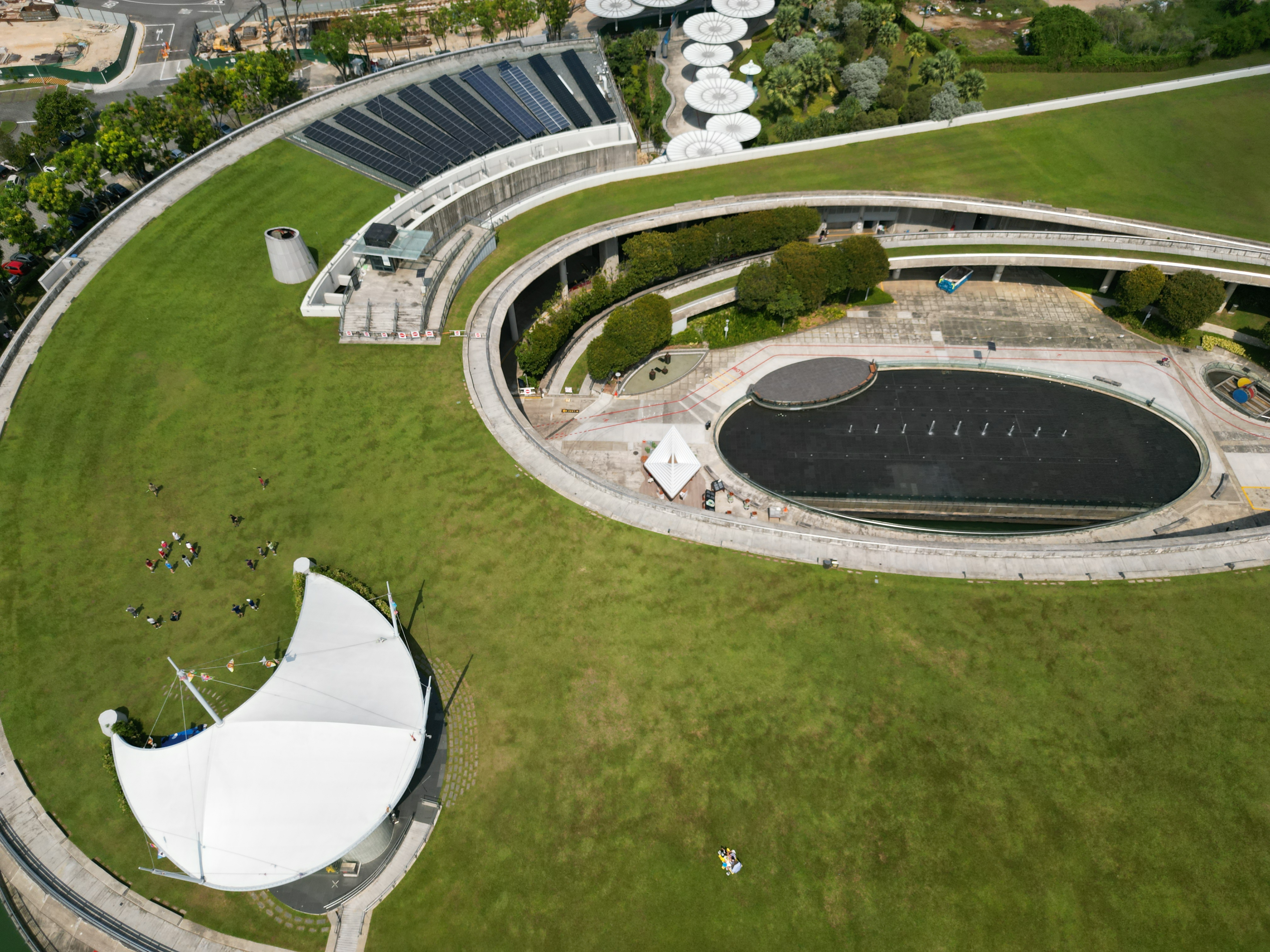
Marina Barrage Open Field

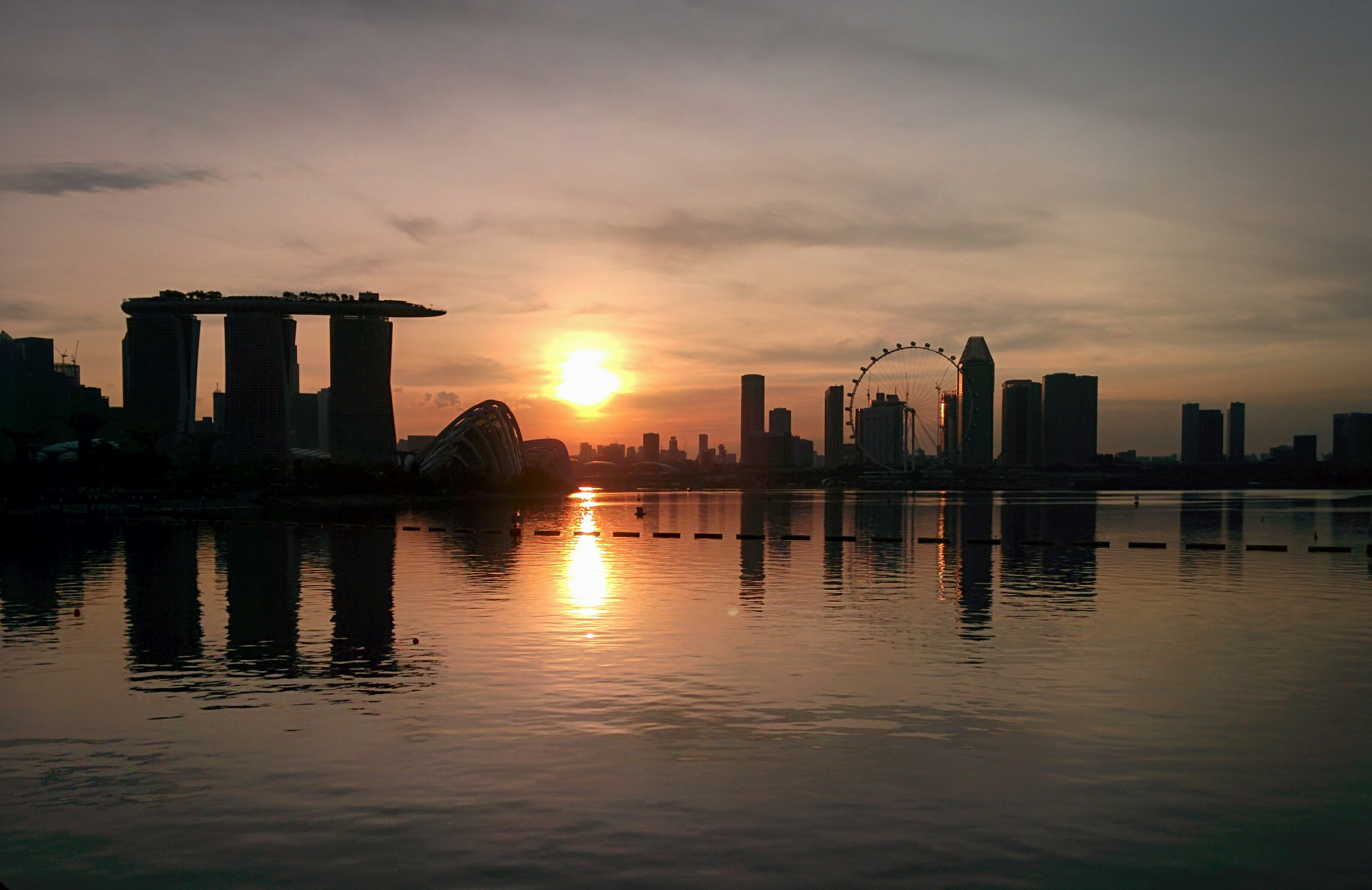
Singapore CBD Sunset from Marina Barrage

== See also ==
- EarthFest Singapore
