= 3CR Melbourne =

3CR

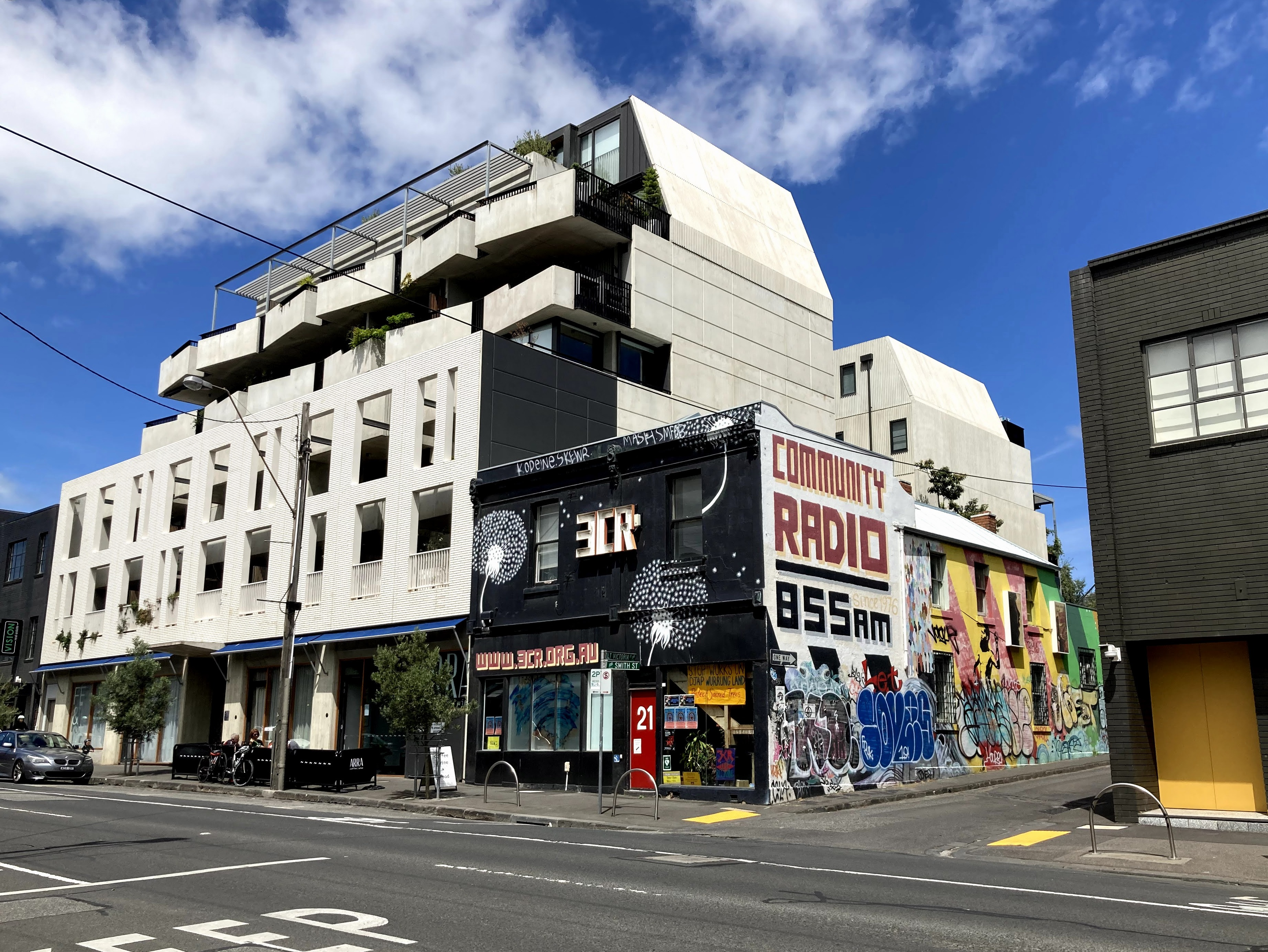
- 3CR's studios in 2020
- Melbourne, Victoria; Australia
- Broadcast area: Melbourne RA1
- Frequencies: AM: 855 kHz; DAB+: 9B Melbourne

Programming
- Language: English
- Format: Community access

Ownership
- Owner: Community Radio Federation Limited

History
- First air date: 3 July 1976
- Former frequencies: AM: 840 kHz (1976–1978); AM: 837 kHz (1978–1983)
- Call sign meaning: Community Radio

Technical information
- Licensing authority: ACMA
- Power: 3500 W
- Transmitter coordinates: 37.886459°S 144.704492°E

Links
- Public licence information: Profile
- Webcast: Listen Live
- Website: www.3cr.org.au

3CR is a community radio station that broadcasts on the AM band and on the digital spectrum as 3CR Digital in Melbourne, Australia. It features mainly talk-based programs with political (particularly trade unions) and environmental themes, as well as some music and community language-based programs. Today the station hosts over 130 programs presented by over 400 volunteers.

The radio station is located in Smith Street, Fitzroy, Victoria. Initially broadcasting on 837 kHz, 3CR now broadcasts on 855 kHz at 2 kW into a directional aerial, from a site at Hoppers Crossing about 15 km west of Melbourne.

== History ==
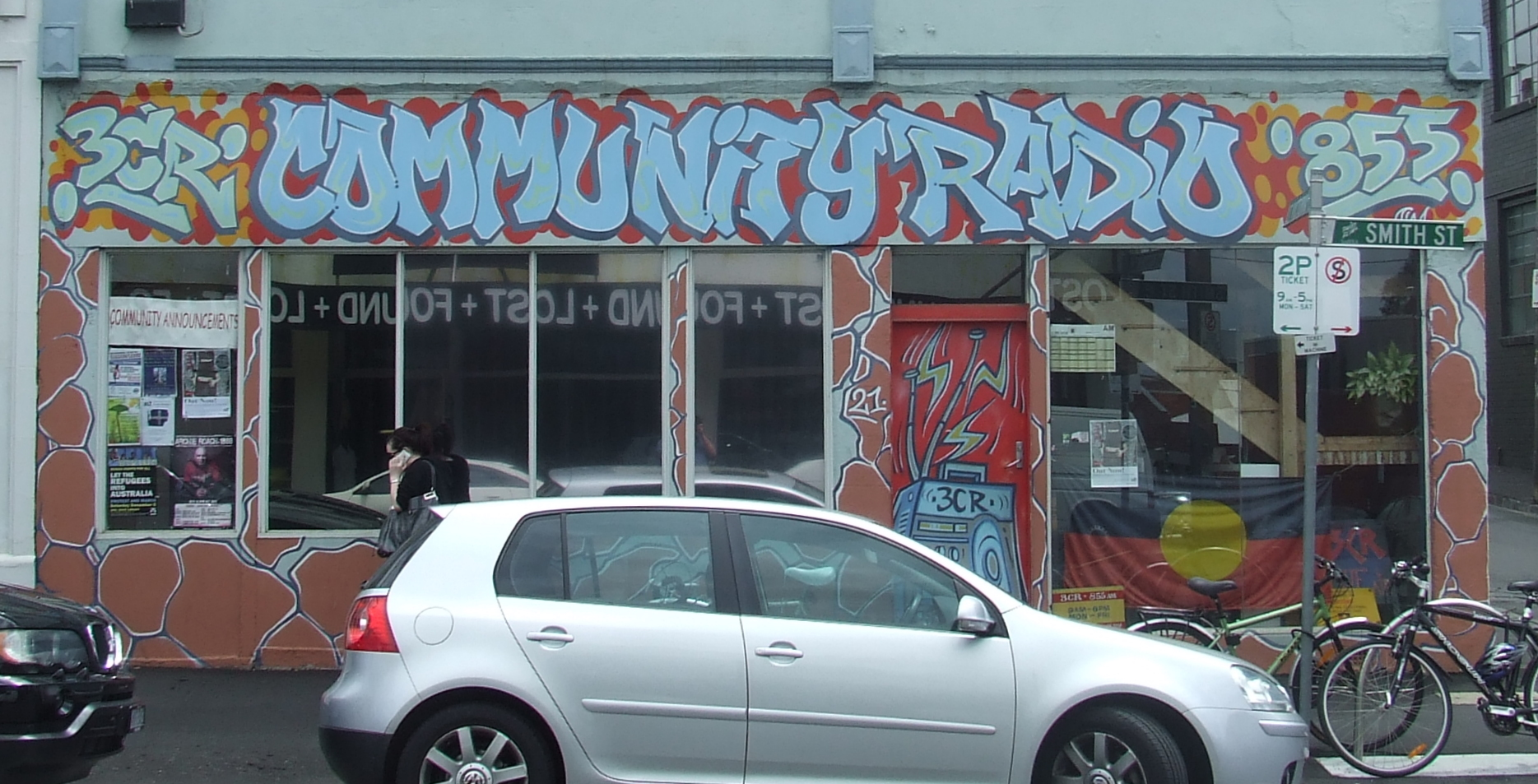
Station exterior in 2009

The station's broadcasting licence was approved on 10 October 1975, by the Minister for the Media, Dr Moss Cass. Test broadcasting began on 1 May 1976, and full operation began 3 July 1976 from studios in High Street, Armadale. The station was Melbourne's first such community radio station to obtain a licence.

3CR began digital broadcasting in 2010. In 2013 the station was part of the "Commit to Community Radio" campaign which successfully convinced the federal government to extend funding for community radio digital broadcasting until 2016. Over 30 shows now publish a podcast on the website.

In 2016, 3CR published a history of the station titled Radical radio: Celebrating 40 years of 3CR.

=== Controversies ===
In 1978 The Bulletin accused 3CR of being "the voice of terrorism", because of 3CR's support for the Palestinian position in the Israeli–Palestinian conflict. A series of meetings between 3CR, the Jewish Board of Deputies and the Public Broadcasting Association took place. As 3CR was not prepared to give in to the demands of the Jewish Board of Deputies, they initiated a full tribunal hearing about 3CR's coverage of the issue. During two weeks of a 'Fight Back' campaign in November, about 1,000 listener sponsors helped distribute nearly 500,000 leaflets throughout the Melbourne metropolitan area, supporting and outlining 3CR's views.

In the mid-1990s, the station was infiltrated by undercover members of the Victoria Police who pretended to be volunteers to gather information.

== Programming ==
=== Special broadcasts ===
Since its founding, 3CR has done regular live broadcasts from major activist events in Melbourne and beyond, including Occupy Melbourne, the S11 World Economic Forum protests, the Honeymoon Mine occupation, and union campaigns.

Regular special broadcasts include:

- "Beyond the Bars" - an annual broadcast since 2001, by Indigenous prisoners from inside various men's and women's prisons. In 2021, the Melbourne Social Equity Institute awarded a Community Engagement Grant to 3CR and the University of Melbourne's School of Social and Political Sciences to develop a Beyond the Bars digital archive. In acknowledging the cultural significance of the program, a collection of promotional posters, CDs, and CD covers from the program are now preserved in an online archive
- Survival Day – hosted by indigenous programmers on 26 January
- Sustainable Living Festival - 3CR holds live forums from the festival every year, including environmental science experts David Suzuki and Clive Hamilton
- International Women's Day - hosted by women on 8 March
- International Day of People with Disability – 12 hours of programming by and about people living with disabilities on 3 December
- Human Rights Day – 10 December

=== Women ===
In 1986, 3CR became to first radio station in Australia to appoint a paid Women's Officer. The station hosts several programmes promoting women's voices in both English and community languages, and feminist current affairs shows. It also promotes training opportunities for girls and women, such as Girls Radio Club.

In July 2013, a program by Clemmie Wetherall from 'Women on the Line' on family violence was recognised by the Eliminating Violence Against Women Media Awards in the category 'Best Radio News / Current Affairs'. Her piece used a well–known Hollywood incident to explore family violence and make it relevant to the ordinary person.

=== Gay and lesbian (LGBTIQA+) ===
Gay Liberation (Melbourne) was a founding member of 3CR in 1975, with the Gay Liberation Radio Collective producing their first program, and Australia's first gay radio program, in 1976. The Gay Liberation program was following by the Lesbian and Gay Show, HIV Plus (formerly Positively Primed), In Ya Face, Dykes on Mics, Out of the Pan, and Queering The Air. Lesbian, gay, trans*, and queer issues are also covered in current affairs and social justice programming. For example, 3CR aired a special podcast in early 2025 on the queer history of the city of Merri-bek called Queer Histories Queer Futures.

== Governance ==
3CR is run by a combination of paid staff, an oversight committee, and over 300 volunteers. Oversight is provided by a Committee of Management made up of 3CR programmers, volunteers and supporters, elected annually. The station is supported by listener donations and fundraising. It does not accept commercial advertising or sponsorship.

3CR is owned by the Community Radio Federation Ltd. The Federation is made up of representatives of 3CR affiliates, subscribers and station workers. It was formed at a public meeting held at The Pram Factory in Carlton on 23 June 1974.

== Awards ==
3CR has won several awards from the Community Broadcasting Association of Australia, including:

- (2008) Most Innovative Outside Broadcast or Special Event Broadcast - for live coverage of the National Apology and Convergence
- (2009) Excellence in Digital Media - for the station's new website
- (2009) Contribution to Indigenous Broadcasting - for "Beyond the Bars 5"
- (2010) Most Innovative Outside Broadcast or Special Event Broadcast - for Disability Day broadcast
- (2011) Excellence in Spoken Word, News and Current Affairs Programming - Earth Matters, an environmental program
- (2012) Excellence in Technical/IT Services - Greg Segal
- (2012) Excellence in Training - Brainwaves, a program about mental illness
- (2012) Outstanding Volunteer Contribution - Michael Smith
- (2019) Best Radio Program (Talks) - QR Code
