= EOY Cosplay Festival =

Japanese pop culture event in Singapore

EOY Music, Comics & Arts Festival
- EOY's logo
- Status: Active
- Frequency: Annually
- Country: Singapore
- Inaugurated: 1999
- Most recent: 28 December 2025
- Attendance: 20,000+ in 2013
- Website: http://www.theeoy.com

EOY Music, Comics & Arts Festival is a Japanese pop-cultural arts event that is non-profit and fan-run multigenre convention featuring anime, cosplay, doujin works, subculture fashion and Japanese pop music held in Singapore. From 2012 to 2017, it was a free public event.

Its highlights include the hundreds of cosplayers who visit each year, it gives opportunities for cosplay photography, guest performances by Japanese celebrities, music and dance performances by home-grown talents, artwork exhibitions and booths selling anime merchandise and personal artworks.

Alongside the annual events, EOY also partners related organisations to hold periodic events and performances related to anime, cosplay and music. Notable ones include the Singapore Silver Cosplay Club cosplay competition, Walk for Our Children (Singapore Children's Society), TAO “Art of Drum”, Liang Court Anime Week, Bon Japan Theme Cafes, SGCafe Maid and Butler Cafe and Marie Digby's Your Love Asia Tour.

== History ==
EOY was first organized by Miyuki Animation Club (MAC). MAC was a then-club under Fengshan Community Centre. The Shiro Tsubasa Anime Club took over the management of the event until 2008.

From 2009, EOY has been run by EOY LLP.

In 2012, EOY made a shift from the typical paid indoor convention model to a public festival in the open that was free. EOY Cosplay Festival 2012 was held in Marina Barrage and attained a huge jump in attendance from 4000 in 2011 to over 10,000 in 2012. In 2013, the attendance was doubled to 20,000.

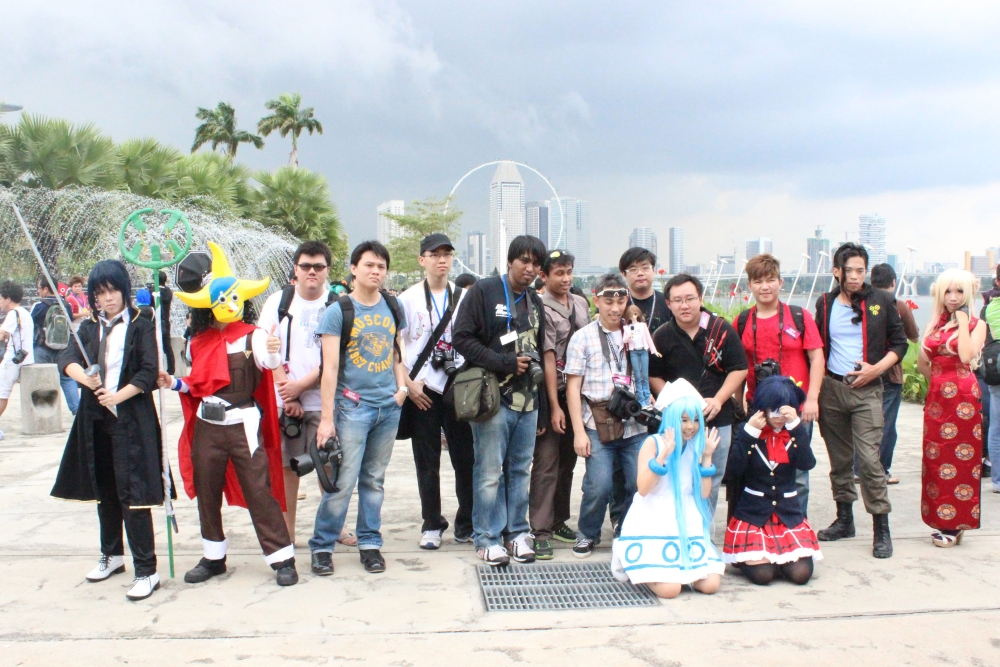
Cosplayers and photographers at EOY Cosplay Festival 2012

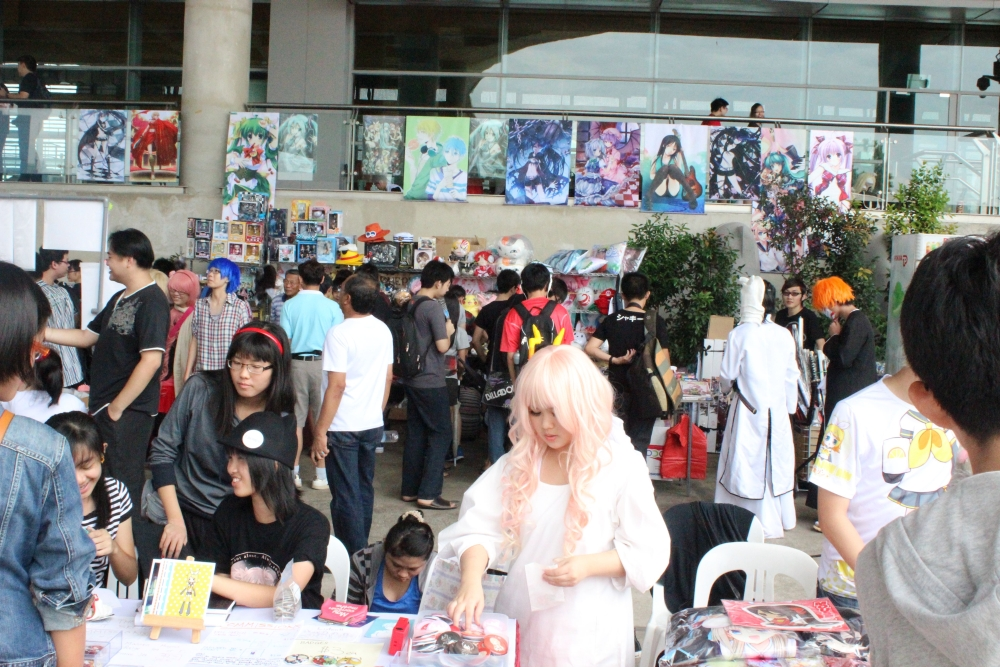
Doujin and Anime Merchandise Booths at EOY Cosplay Festival 2012

Year	Date	Event Theme	Venue
Pre-2009	NA	NA	Singapore Expo
2009	26 December	An Extraordinary Journey	Drama Centre, The National Library, Singapore
2010	12 December	Fun, Creativity and Friendship	Republic Cultural Centre, Republic Polytechnic
2011	17 December	A Day of Celebration	Republic Cultural Centre, Republic Polytechnic
2012	9 December	EOY Cosplay Festival 2012	Marina Barrage
2013	15 December	EOY Cosplay Festival 2013	Marina Barrage
2014	2–3 August	EOY Cosplay Festival 2014	Marina Barrage
2015	15–16 August	EOY Cosplay Festival 2015	Marina Barrage
2016	10–11 December	EOY Cosplay Festival 2016	Marina Barrage
2017	9–10 December	EOY J-Culture Festival 2017	Marina Barrage
2018	29–30 December	EOY J-Culture Festival 2018	Suntec Singapore Convention and Exhibition Centre
2019	28–29 December	EOY J-Culture Festival 2019	Suntec Singapore Convention and Exhibition Centre
2022	24–25 December	EOY J-Culture Festival 2022	Suntec Singapore Convention and Exhibition Centre
2023	30–31 December	EOY J-Culture Festival 2023	Suntec Singapore Convention and Exhibition Centre
2024	21–22 December	EOY J-Culture Festival 2024	Suntec Singapore Convention and Exhibition Centre
2025	27–28 December	EOY J-Culture Festival 2025	Raffles City Convention Centre
2026	25–26 December	EOY J-Culture Festival 2026	Suntec Singapore Convention and Exhibition Centre

== Mascot ==
Kyouyaku Yume is a blue-haired girl with no recollection of her identity and past. With a vaguely written clue and a turquoise pebble which she found on herself when she awoke, she goes on a journey of self-discovery.

Yume is specially created by Daiyaku, a Singapore-based art group, for EOY. She is a representation of how the artists believe that people can discover their identity, talents and purpose in life through meeting people and courage to experience new things.

== Activities ==
Aside from stage performances and cosplay photography, the festival also features other fringe activities, depending on participating sponsors and exhibitors.

Activities featured in recent years:

- Each year, EOY holds auditions for locally based singers, dancers and musicians who wish to get stage time at EOY. Popular types of music used in these performances include anime theme songs and Japanese pop. The performances run from afternoon to evening.

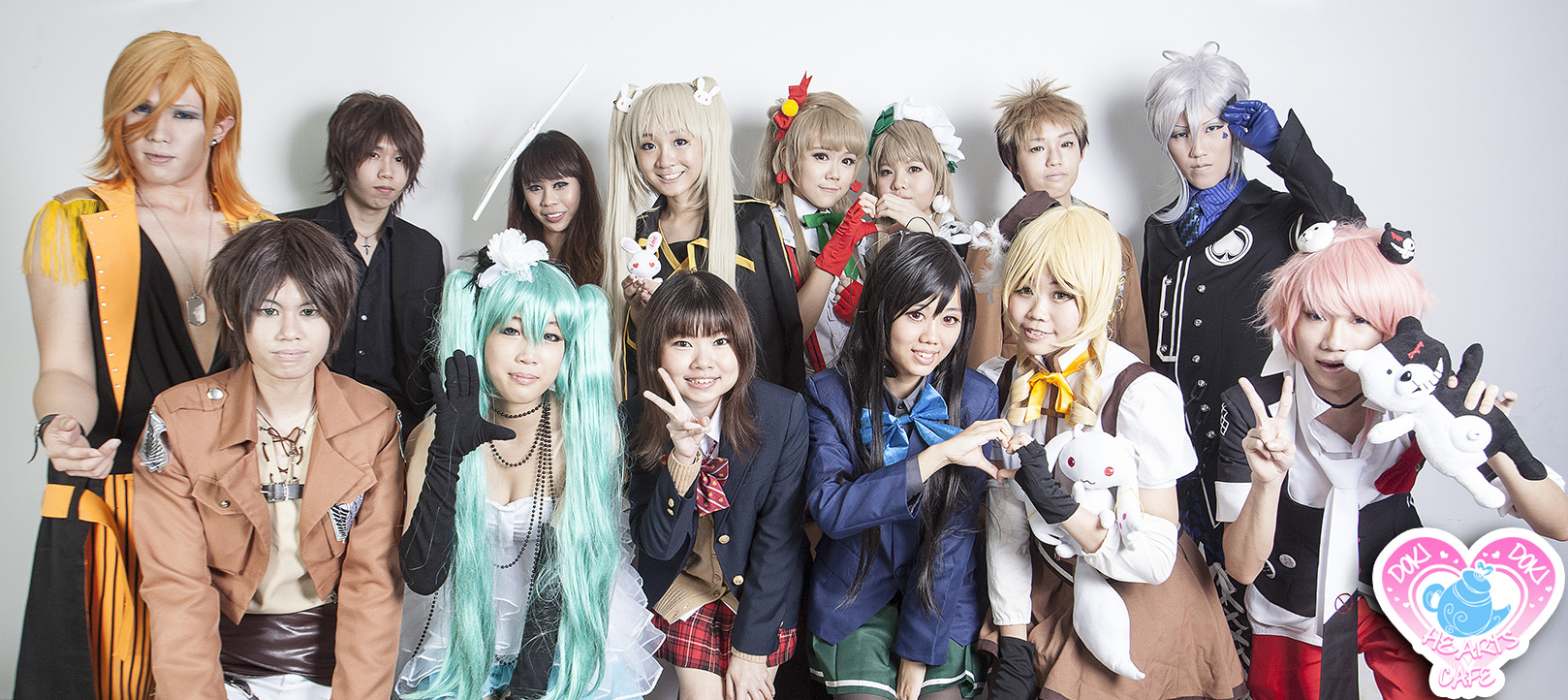
Staff profile picture of Doki Doki Hearts Cafe

- Doki Doki Hearts Cafe: In 2012, EOY organised its very own Cosplay Cafe. The staff, clad in costumes of their favourite characters, were selected through auditions, and were made to undergo training. At the cafe, they serve desserts to customers while staying in character of whoever they're cosplaying. Cafe guests were treated to desserts from local Japanese-French dessert shop Sashing Sweets, “power-up” chants by the staff, and also get their photo taken with their favourite cafe staff. For its first year, it was highly successful, having attracted over 300 orders via preorder and walk-in.
- Cosplay Photography Exhibition: Local photographer Tan Ching Yee visited, interviewed and photographed more than 20 cosplayers in their homes and put together a unique exhibition featuring portraits of cosplayers that reveal hints of their private lives.
- Ball-jointed doll Display Booth: An exhibition booth put together by the local doll collector community, they created a Japanese Garden Theme Doll display booth called "Sakura Blossom of the Spring” with beautiful backdrops, detailed props, and dolls in traditional Japanese clothing.
- Lolita Fashion Runway: A runway made up of and designed by girls the Lolita community in Singapore, showcasing Lolita clothing as worn in Singapore.
- Cosplay Contest : In 2013, Singapore Press Holdings held an online cosplay photo submission contest. Judging is done via public voting and by a panel of judges and the prizes were presented on stage at EOY Cosplay Festival 2013.

== Performances ==
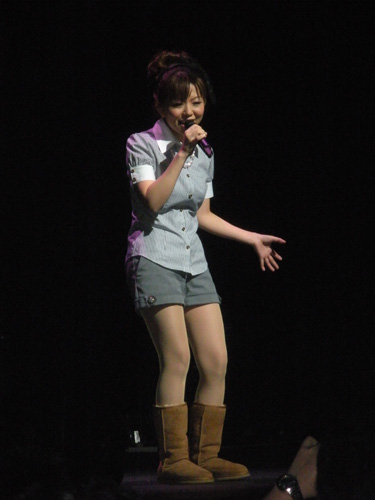
Yui Makino performing at EOY 2009

- Yui Makino (2009)

Yui gave two concerts; a 15-minute-long mini concert and a full-length 45-minute-long concert. Songs performed included "Fuwa Fuwa", "Amrita" and theme songs from Tsubasa Chronicle and Aria. She also held two autograph sessions and a Q-and-A session with the audience. Prior to her appearance, she made a special comment video.

- DANCEROID (2010), comprising
  - Aikawa Kozue
  - Ikura

Aikawa Kozue and Ikura (also known as Itokutora) gave two dancicals. They performed duets to "Luka Luka ★ Night Fever", "FirstKiss!","Gravity=Reality", "Megu Megu ☆ Fire Endless Night", "Lily Lily ★ Burning Night" and "LOL -lots of laugh-". Ikura and Aikawa Kozue each performed a solo dance to "Strobe Night" and "Teach me!! The Lyrics of Magic" respectively. They also did a mass dance with the audience to "Luka Luka ★ Night Fever", where some members of the audience were allowed to join them on stage. An autograph session and a Q-and-A session with the audience were held.

- Hitomi from @home Cafe (2011)

Apart from serving food in a very 'moe' way, drawing cute pictures on dishes and casting magical spells on food, Hitomi also delivers singing and dancing performances regularly at @home Cafe. She also performed a 45-minute-long song and dance performance at EOY 2011, and served lunch to the VIP ticket holders.

- Wata わた (2013)

Wata performed 2 sets of dances at the EOY Coslay Festival 2013 spanning over an approximate time of 40minutes, and a flashmob with a group of local dancers. She also held a meet-and-greet-session, where merchandise including T-shirts, towels, wristbands and phone straps were on sale.

== Sponsorship ==
To cope with the costs of funding the event, the organising team seeks out sponsors and partners to provide financial and in-kind support. These sponsors and partners include Singapore Press Holdings, Wacom, OCBC, Bunka Language Pte. School, Pan-In-The-Box, Brigitte Cosmetics, ACS Comics, Toy Coin, Happy Ice Pte Ltd, BonJapan, Youth.SG, Sapporo Beer Singapore, Orchard Hotel Singapore, PAssion Card, Coca-Cola Singapore, Pink Blue Photography, Platiper Software, Sashing Sweets, Baby the Stars Shine Bright and Shiseido.
