= Singapore River Festival =

Annual festival

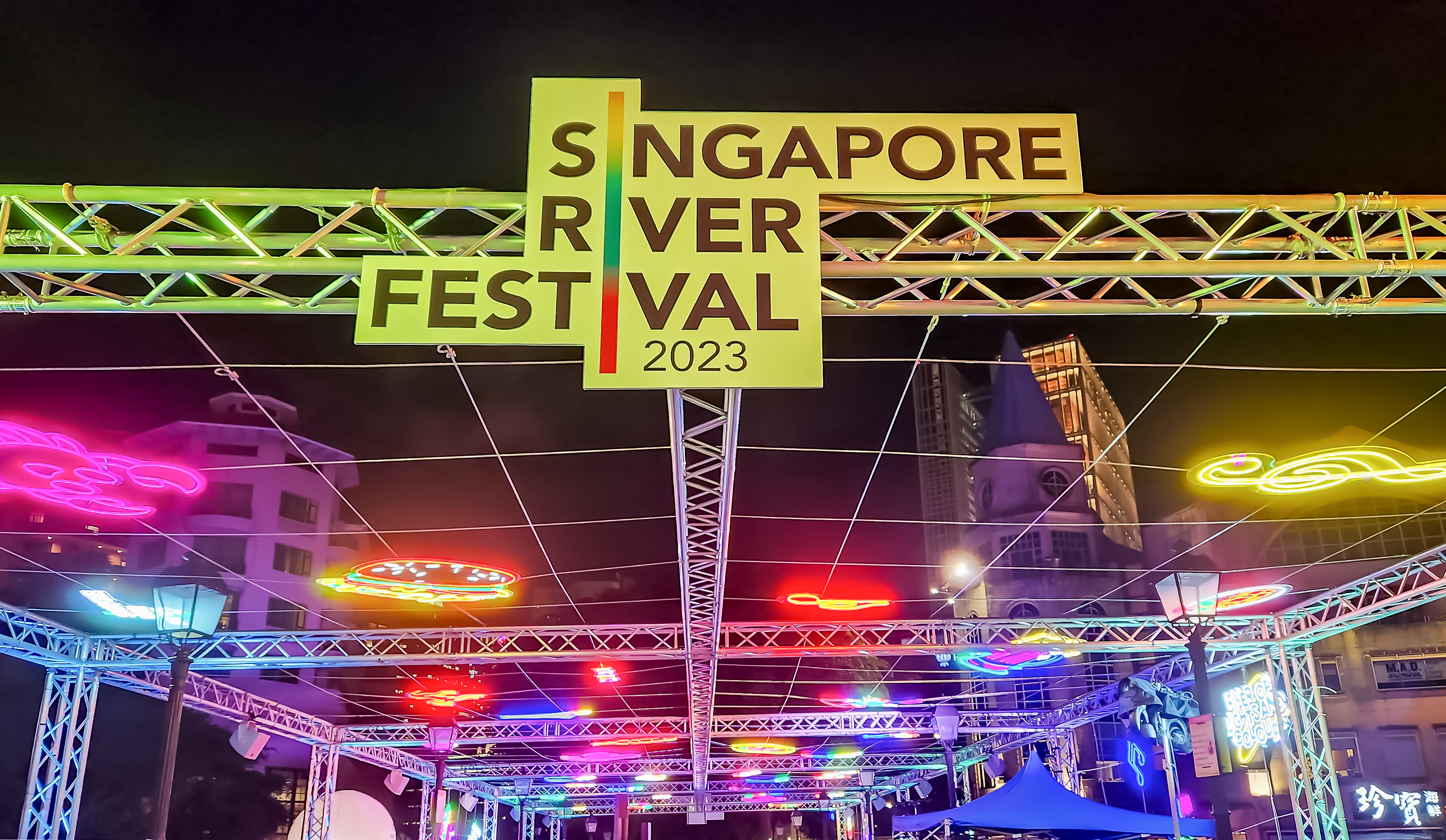
Read Bridge during the 2023 edition of the Singapore River Festival.

The Singapore River Festival is an annual festival held in Singapore alongside the Singapore River. It started in 2015 as part of Singapore's Golden Jubilee celebrations. The festival is organised by Singapore River One.

The inaugural festival in 2005 featured Spanish theatrical troupe La Fura dels Baus, a ten-day outdoor exhibition called Urban Artery and Riverside Makers Market where local craftsmen and kitchens sell their products. The festival drew an estimated 105,000 visitors.

The 2016 festival's theme is "River Connections" and drew an estimated 130,000 people.

The 2017 festival's theme is "Turn Up The River" and the festival included an outdoor dance floor and a display of light-emitting diode (LED) kites at the Singapore River.

For the 2023 edition, the theme is “River of Lights and Colours” and will see the lighting up of 3 bridges along the Singapore River - Cavenagh Bridge in Boat Quay, Read Bridge in Clarke Quay and Alkaff Bridge in Robertson Quay.
