= Sustainable Living Festival =

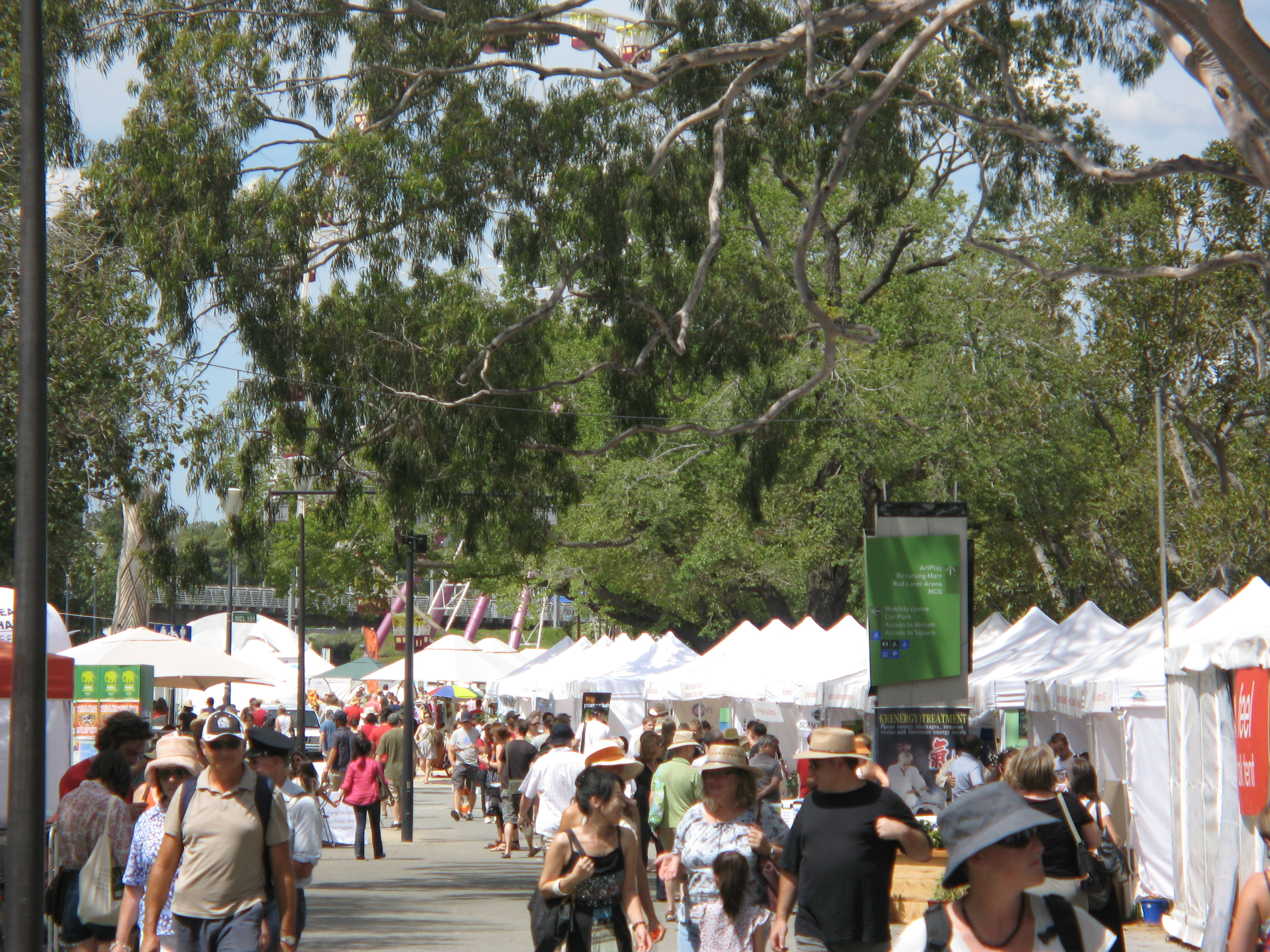
Stalls along the river side during the 2010 Sustainable Living Festival.

The National Sustainable Living Festival is an annual national festival held since 1998 in Melbourne at Federation Square and Birrarung Marr along the Yarra River.

== Description ==
The month long program includes presentations by local government representatives, environmental and renewable energy groups, experts in climate science and solutions, workshops, demonstrations and discussions about sustainability, and art and music.
