= Singapore Food Festival =

Annual food festival in Singapore

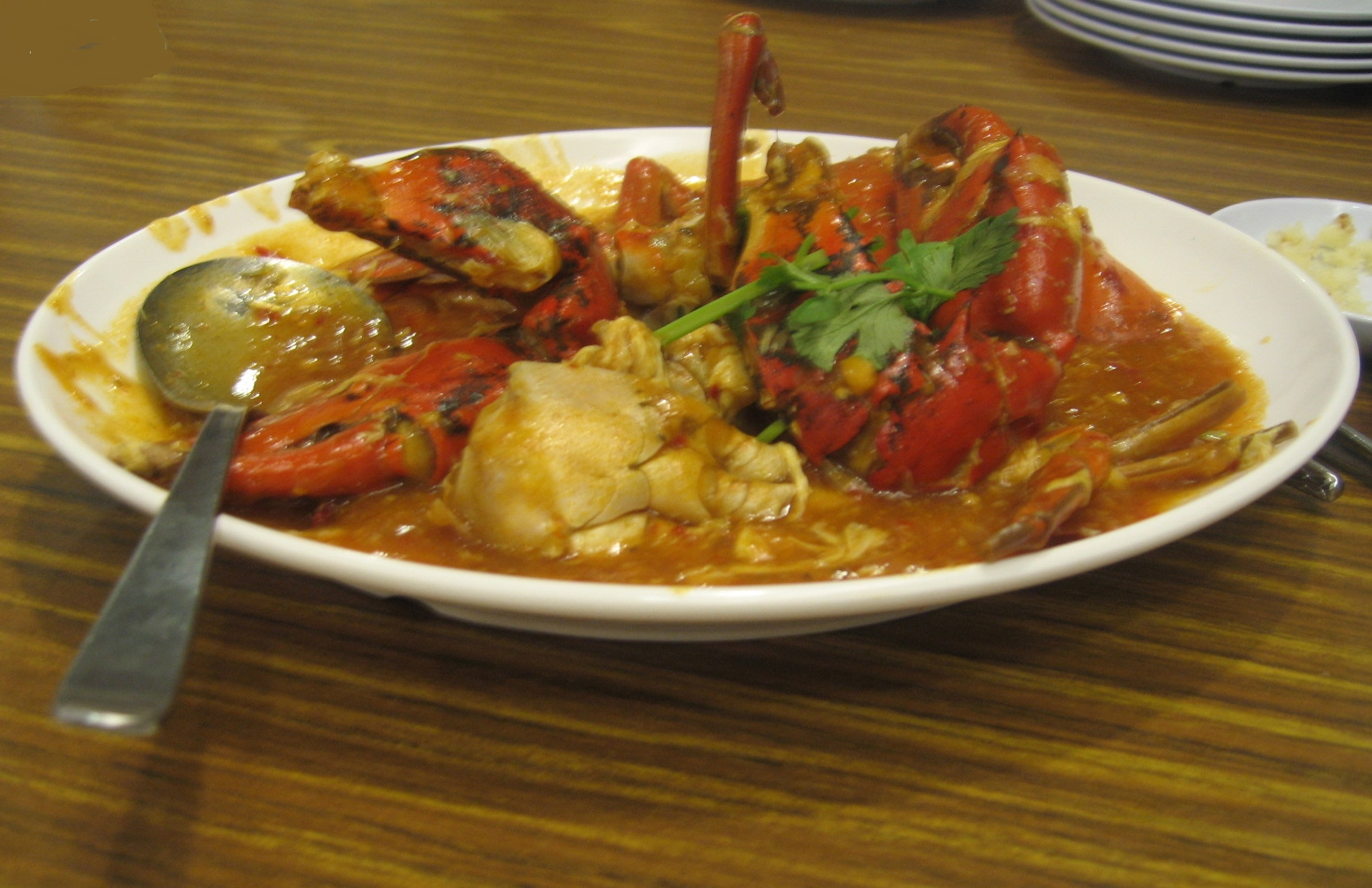
Chilli crab, one of the main dishes featured in the Singapore Food Festival

The Singapore Food Festival is an annual event in the Asian city-state of Singapore. Taking place every year from the end of June to the end of July, it is organised by the Singapore Tourism Board.

Composed of weekly core events, themed celebrations, culinary workshops, and competitions organised island-wide, this month-long festival celebrates the local perennial food favourites that have given Singapore an international reputation of a diverse food heaven. In 2025, the theme was "Have You Eaten Yet?" Some of the local features include: Hawker Wine Safari, Kueh Appreciation Day, the Singapore Tea Festival, the 50 Cents Fest and more.

== See also ==
- List of festivals in Singapore
