= Beyond Zero Emissions =

Australian climate change organisation

- Established: 2006
- Mission: To inspire political leadership and accelerate policy change
- President: Heidi Lee
- Address: 247 Flinders Lane, Melbourne 3000
- Location: Melbourne, Australia
- Website: bze.org.au

Beyond Zero Emissions (BZE) is an Australia-based, internationally recognised climate change solutions think-tank. The organization produces independent economic and public policy research on transitioning advanced economies to a zero emissions models. Beyond Zero Emission's stated research aims to provide detailed pathways for a rapid transition in each major sector of Australia's economy. The organisation is funded by donations from individuals and charitable trusts, including the Lord Mayor's Charitable Foundation and the Hamer Family Fund.

== Research ==
BZE's public research portfolio demonstrates viable pathways for varied sectors of the Australian economy to transition to renewable resources, and provides public policy guidelines to promote this transition. The substantiative theme of the research is that policy changes, including grants and levies, can be used to encourage the transformation of Australia's aging non-renewable power generation and transport systems into compliance with international agreements. Much of this research shows that there are significant economic benefits to the transition to zero emissions technology, alongside the mitigation of human impact on the environment. The series ofZero Carbon Australia plans cover renewable energy and electricity; energy efficient buildings; sustainable transport; agriculture, farming and land use; and the manufacturing industry.

=== Million Jobs Plan ===
BZE launched its Million Jobs Plan in June 2020, in response to the global Covid-19 pandemic and the economic crisis which followed. The framework for creating 1.8 million jobs was backed by corporate heavyweights Atlassian co-founder, Mike Cannon-Brookes, First State Super CEO, Deanne Stewart, and long-serving corporate director Kevin McCann AO. Christiana Figueres, one of the UN architects of the Paris Agreement, joined BZE's panel discussion for the launch of the Million Jobs Plan from Costa Rica, where a blackout meant that Figueres was only able to continue her involvement due to a home battery system powered by solar.

This plan, billed to deliver "one million new, good, secure, well-paying Australian jobs" was the first stage in a campaign to help rebuild the Australian economy from the COVID-19 recession. The report identified seven key sectors across the economy for strategic investment over the next five years to maximise impact: Energy, Building, Manufacturing, Transport, Recycling, Land Use and Training, with a focus on counter-urbanisation. Jobs will be distributed around Australia, including in cities and regions already under pressure from the closure of traditional heavy industry and manufacturing, historical droughts and fires, and high unemployment.

=== Zero Carbon Communities ===
Zero Carbon Communities is an ongoing initiative of Beyond Zero Emissions designed to support local communities to reduce emissions and thrive. The program provides support and resources to empower local communities. Together with Ironbark Sustainability, BZE has developed the Snapshot community climate tool, which provides nationally consistent, community-wide greenhouse gas profiles for every local government area in Australia.

In 2020, Zero Carbon Communities partnered with ABC's series, Fight for Planet A: Our Climate Challenge, and was featured in their Community Solutions Plan. The ABC's three part series explores how humans can all reduce their individual and collective carbon emissions. It sought to empower and motivate Australians to take action on climate change.

=== Renewable Energy Superpower ===
In 2015, BZE published the Renewable Energy Superpower report, proposing that nations with abundant renewable energy resources, like Australia, can be the energy superpowers of the renewable energy era. The report showed that if Australia made the most of its renewable resources, it could be the natural home for energy intensive industry, given the ever-decreasing cost of renewable technologies.

The term ‘renewable energy superpower' was used for the first time in BZE's report, which was launched by Prof Ross Garnaut, and has passed into common use.

== Activities ==
In addition to its collaborative research and technical support programs, the group gives webinars and presentations nationally, and runs a public discussion group on climate science and global warming solutions.

BZE takes part in many local events and conferences around Australia.

In 2016, BZE became a signatory to the campaign for a Declaration of a Climate Emergency by the Australian Parliament. In the lead up to the UN COP22 at Marrakech, Morocco, BZE officially became a partner in the Global 100% Renewable Energy Campaign.

== Funding ==
BZE is independently funded by donations, mostly from philanthropic trusts and individuals, as well as grants and commissioned research and projects from local and state government organisations.

BZE does not accept donations or commissioned work from political parties.

== Recognition ==
- Environmental Volunteer Award, Premier's Sustainability Awards (Victoria) 2019
- Ranked #26 in the Think Tank to Watch index, 2019 Global Go To Think Tank Index Report, by the Think Tanks and Civil Societies Program (TTCSP) of the Lauder Institute at the University of Pennsylvania
- Ranked #49 in the Best Independent Think Tanks index, 2019 Global Go To Think Tank Index Report, by the Think Tanks and Civil Societies Program (TTCSP) of the Lauder Institute at the University of Pennsylvania
- Best International Energy Think Tank, Prospect Think Tank Awards 2018
- Recommended as one of the best organisations for improving climate policy in Australia, Giving Green, 2021

== Directors ==
The Board is appointed by members, and brings diverse skills including investment, philanthropy, energy and climate expertise, communications and engagement and legal. The Chief Executive Officer reports to the Board. The current Board and CEO comprises:

- Geoff Summerhayes (Chair), Financial services and prudential regulation
- Phil Vernon, Director, Advisor, Investor
- Dr Anne K Hellstedt, Innovation Precinct Director, ANSTO
- Elisa de Wit, Partner, Norton Rose Fulbright
- Cristina Talacko, Entrepreneur, owner and founder of SalDoce Fine Foods
- Susheela Peres da Costa, Stewardship, Strategy and Governance
- Heidi Lee (CEO), expert in sustainable buildings and cities

== History ==
2006

- Beyond Zero Emissions was founded in 2006 by Matthew Wright and Adrian Whitehead under the guidance of Philip Sutton
- 3CR community radio invites BZE to create live weekly programs. Until 2021, they broadcast two radio shows each week, featuring many well-known local and global climate education and climate solutions practitioners.

2008

- BZE joins the Climate Emergency Network – a collection of climate groups in Melbourne that takes a coordinated approach to climate change science and solutions
- The first monthly BZE discussion group takes place in Melbourne to allow for the free exchange of mainly technical climate solutions information and ideas.

2009

- BZE begins work on the Zero Carbon Australia (ZCA) plans – initially with the Climate Emergency Network, with generous support from Climate Positive. This develops into a research collaboration between BZE and the University of Melbourne Energy Research Institute.

2010

- BZE's Stationary Energy Plan is shortlisted as a finalist in the Banksia Foundation's prestigious Mercedes-Benz Australia Environmental Research Award
- BZE's first report, the Stationary Energy Plan, is released, providing a detailed and practical roadmap for Australia to provide 100% of our electricity from renewables
- A national conversation about 100% renewable energy starts following the release of Stationary Energy Plan.

2011

- BZE's Executive Director, Matthew Wright receives the award of Wild Magazine's Environmentalist of the Year 2011.

2012

- BZE turns the spotlight on the health implications of burning coal in the Harms of Coal Mining report, about the Hunter Valley in New South Wales
- BZE challenges current thinking with their Laggard to Leader Report, exposing the true extent of Australia's contribution to the climate problem and demonstrating their extraordinary potential to forge solutions at home and abroad
- BZE's influential report Repowering Port Augusta is released, providing a blueprint for replacing two coal power stations with renewable energy.

2013

- BZE's Buildings Plan shows how it is possible to achieve zero emissions from Australia's buildings within a decade through retrofits, renewable energy generation and replacing gas appliances
- BZE is included for the first time in the Global Think Tanks to Watch list by the Lauder Institute and is ranked 10th.

2014

- BZE releases new research in its High Speed Rail Report, showing how Australia could have a high speed rail connection from Melbourne to Brisbane within a decade
- BZE publishes a report showing the potential shortfall in revenue from Australia's emissions-intensive exports: Fossil Economy Report
- In its new report, Carbon Capture and Storage, BZE explores the promise of "clean coal" and shows that renewable energy is already cost-competitive
- BZE appears again in the Lauder Institute's list of Global Think Tanks to Watch
- The NSW Nature Conservation Council recognises BZE for its community-based work with an award and $1000 donation from Australian Ethical Investment
- BZE's plans for a high speed rail network make us Business Not-for-profit winners at the Green Lifestyle Awards
- Focusing on the high-emissions agriculture sector, Land Use: Agriculture and Forestry demonstrates how Australian greenhouse gas emissions from agriculture and forestry can be reduced to zero net emissions within 10 years.

2015

- BZE releases The Energy Freedom Home – a practical guidebook for renovators and builders to create comfortable and healthy homes powered by renewable energy
- BZE's vision for a prosperous Australia, powered by renewables, is released in the Renewable Energy Superpower Report
- In the Carbon Crisis Report, BZE shows that Australia has a 50% chance of systemic economic crisis caused by ignoring the global shift to clean energy
- Lauder Institute includes BZE in their list of Global Best International Think Tanks and names BZE 6th in Global Think Tanks to Watch.

2016

- BZE shows how at least 6% of Australia's greenhouse emissions can be eliminated by moving to electric vehicles in our Electric Vehicles Report
- BZE became a signatory to the campaign for a Declaration of a Climate Emergency by the Australian Parliament
- In the lead up to the UN COP22 at Marrakech Morocco, BZE officially became a partner in the Global 100% Renewable Energy Campaign
- BZE ranks 52nd in the Lauder Institute's Global Best International Think Tanks and 16th in their list Global Think Tanks to Watch in 2017.

2017

- BZE publishes a guide for communities who want rapid progress towards zero emissions: Zero Carbon Communities Guide
- BZE's pioneering Rethinking Cement Report presents a pathway to zero carbon cement in Australia
- Lauder Institute names BZE 50th in their Global Best International Think Tanks and 25th in Global Think Tanks to Watch in 2018.

2018

- BZE brings government, manufacturers and allied industries together at their first Electrifying Industry Summit, looking at how renewable energy can improve efficiency and reduce costs for manufacturers
- BZE's Report Electrifying Industry, shows how industrial heat can be electrified and powered by renewable electricity
- BZE releases the Australian Local Government - Climate Review 2018 – their assessment into how Australian councils and communities are tackling climate change
- BZE's Rethinking Cement report is recognised as Best International Energy and Environment Think Tank in the Prospect Think Tank Awards.

2019

- BZE releases NT: The 10 Gigawatt Vision, showing how renewable energy can power jobs and investment in the Northern Territory
- BZE releases Collie at the Crossroads, Planning a Future Beyond Coal. The report describes how a renewable transition and creating a circular economy can lower costs, diversify WA's economy and create healthier, more sustainable regions
- In partnership with Ironbark Sustainability, BZE releases Snapshot, providing greenhouse gas emission profiles at the municipal level. Through offering a snapshot of local emissions, communities are equipped with the information they need to continue to drive change
- BZE's team of volunteers who helped produce the Electrifying Industry Report are recognised by winning the inaugural Environmental Volunteering Award category at the Premier's Sustainability Awards (Victoria).

2020

- BZE releases its Million Jobs Plan

== Publications ==
Since 2006, Beyond Zero Emissions has released the following publications:

- The Million Jobs Plan (2020)
- Collie at the Crossroads: Planning a future beyond coal (2019)
- NT: The 10 Gigawatt Vision (2019)
- Australian Local Government Climate Review (2018)
- Electrifying Industry (2018)
- Re-thinking Cement (2018)
- Zero Carbon Communities Guide (2017)
- Zero Carbon Australia Electric Vehicles (2016)
- Zero Carbon Australia Renewable Energy Superpower (2015)
- Carbon Crisis: Systemic Risk of Carbon Emission Liabilities report (2015)
- Carbon Capture and Storage Report (2014)
- Zero Carbon Australia Land Use - Agriculture and Forestry (2014)
- Fossil Economy (2014)
- Zero Carbon Australia High Speed Rail (2014)
- Zero Carbon Australia Buildings Plan (2013)
- Laggard to Leader: How Australia Can Lead the World to Zero Carbon Prosperity (2012)
- Health and Social Harms of Mining in Local Communities: Spotlight on the Hunter Region report ( 2012)
- Repowering Port Augusta (2012)
- Zero Carbon Australia Stationary Energy Plan (2010)
