= Waterboat House Garden =

Park at Singapore River

- Former Merlion Park
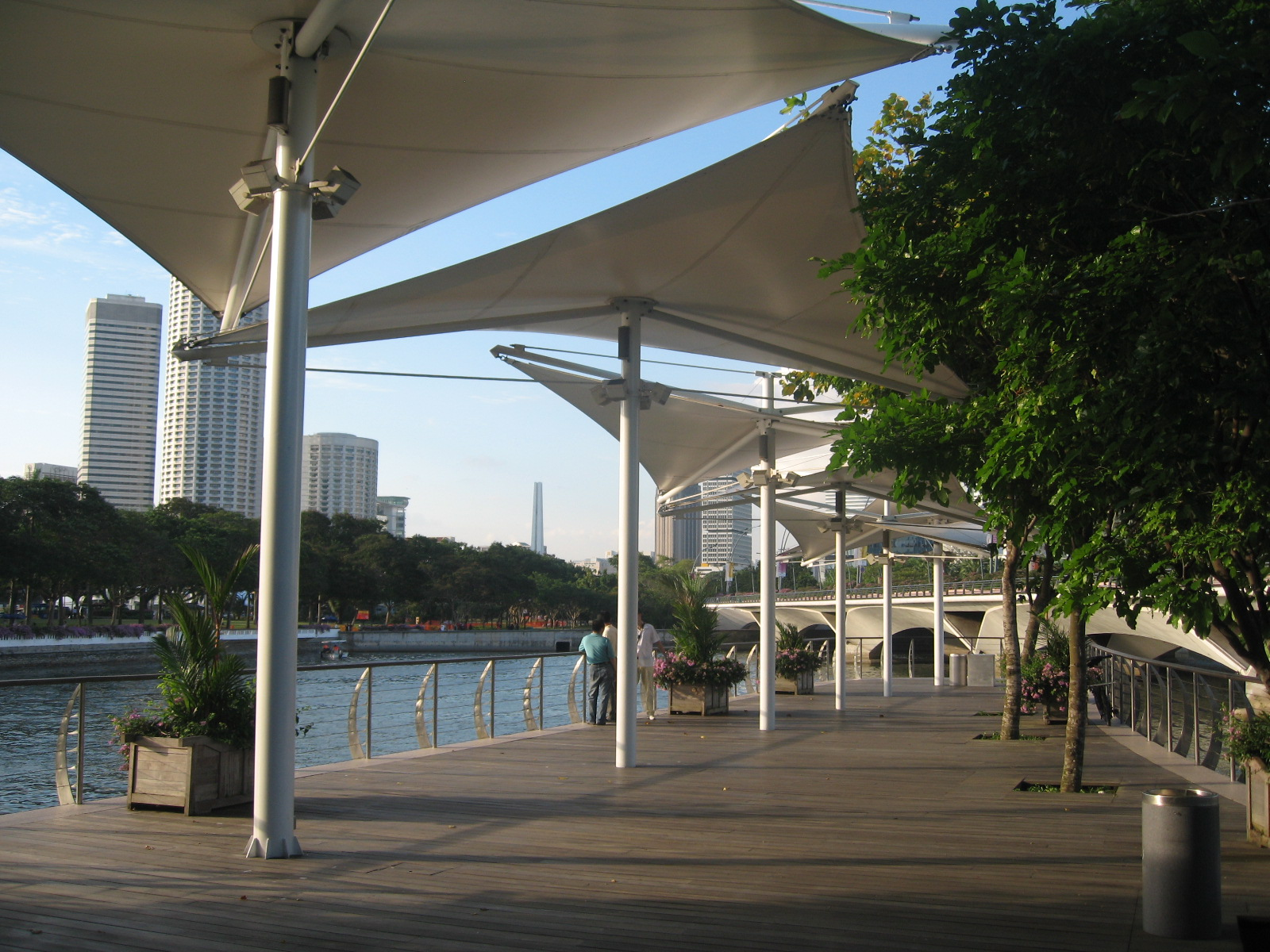
- Former Merlion Park, currently Waterboat House Garden

- Location within Singapore
- Type: historical park
- Location: Singapore
- Coordinates: 1°17′14.3″N 103°51′12.2″E
- Area: 0.738 hectares (1.82 acres)
- Opened: 15 September 1972; 53 years ago
- Status: Open

Waterboat House Garden is a small park located near the mouth of the Singapore River, near the Central Business District (CBD) in Singapore. The park was once the original site of the former Merlion Park where the two iconic statues of the Merlion and its miniature form were originally located.

== History ==
=== Launch ===
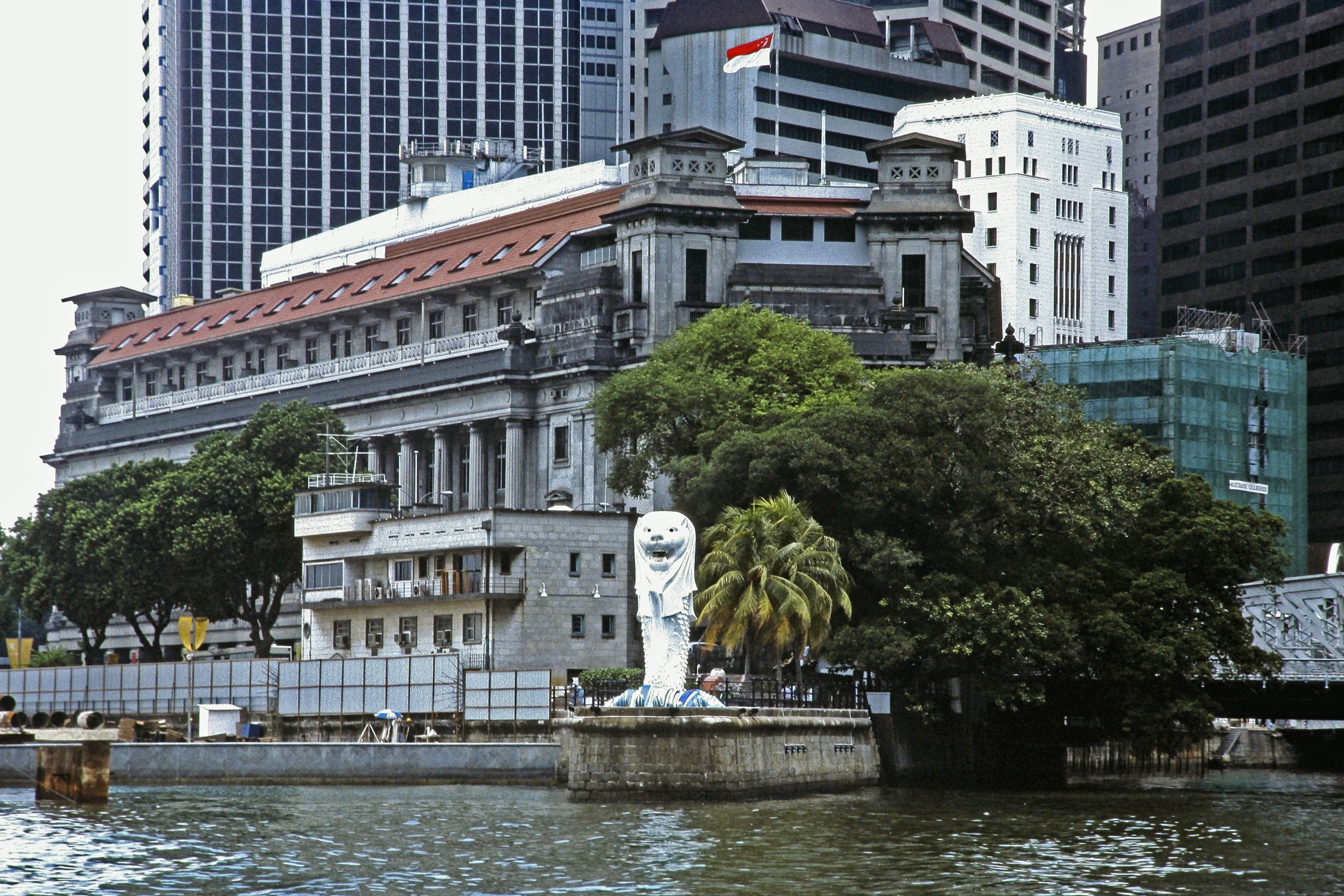
Original Merlion Park at the mouth of the Singapore River in 1994.

The first Merlion Park was originally located near the mouth of the Singapore River was designed by the Singapore Tourism Board as an emblem of Singapore in 1964. The park was officially opened at an installation ceremony for the Merlion statue, officiated by Prime Minister Lee Kuan Yew on 15 September 1972. The original statues of the Merlion and its miniature version used to stand at the mouth of the Singapore River with Anderson Bridge as its background. The main statue was made from November 1971 to August 1972 by Singaporean sculptor Lim Nang Seng. It measures 8.6 meters high and weighs 70 tons.

=== Relocation of the Merlion Statue ===
Due to the completion of the Esplanade Bridge in 1997, the statue could no longer be viewed clearly from the Marina Bay Waterfront. On 23 April 2002, the Merlion statue and its miniature statue were relocated from its original location to a new pier specially built on the other side of the Esplanade Bridge adjacent to the One Fullerton Hotel, which was completed on 25 April 2002. The new Merlion Park, which is four times bigger than the original site, had officially been opened since then.

=== Present ===
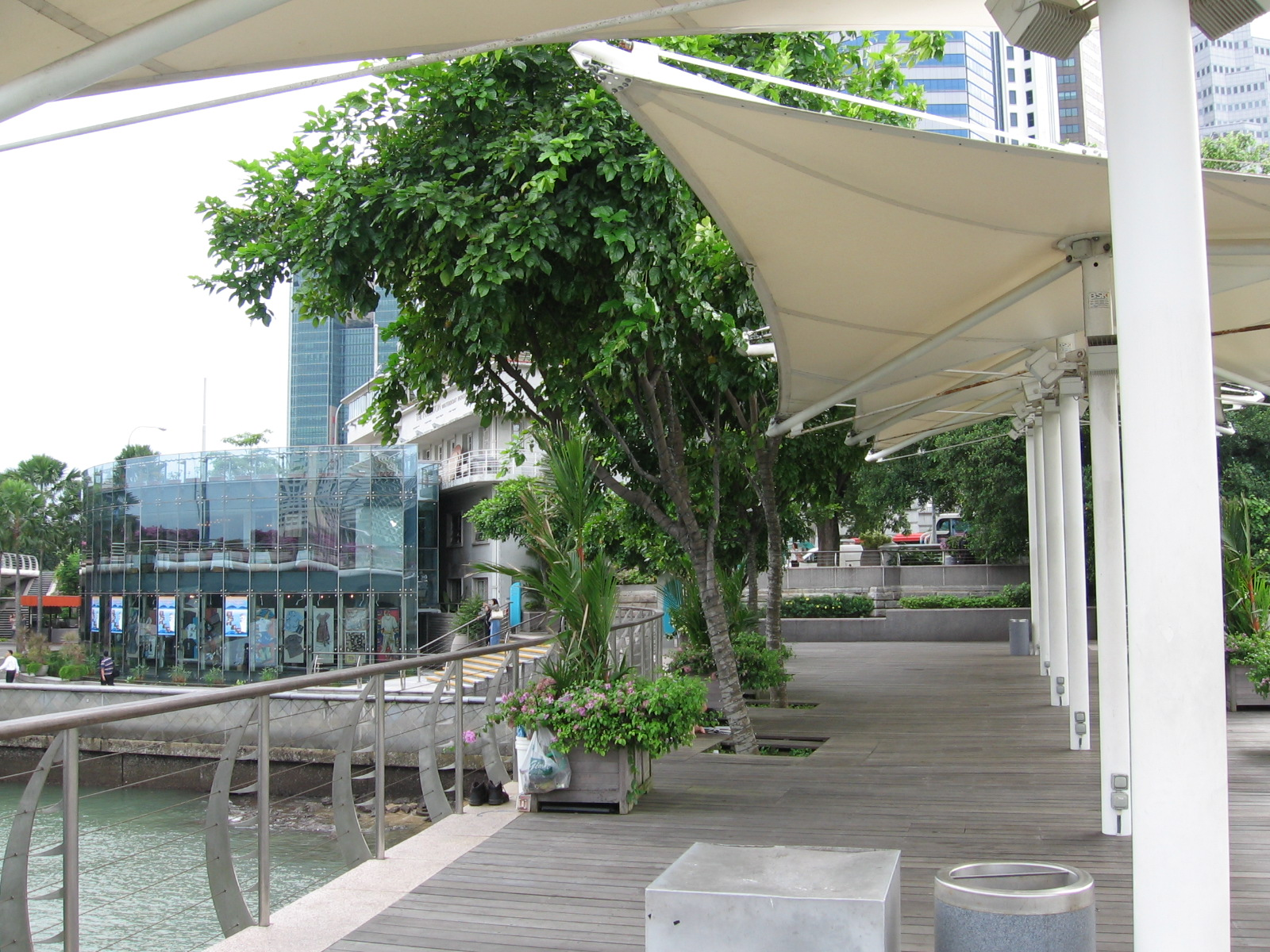
Another view of the Former Merlion Park, facing The Fullerton Waterboat House

The site of former Merlion Park had since being renamed as the Waterboat House Garden, so named from the nearby historical building Waterboat House, the renovated Water House which was built in 1919.

== See also ==
- Merlion
- Merlion Park
