= Anderson Bridge (Singapore) =

Anderson Bridge Jambatan Anderson 安德逊桥 ஆண்டர்சன் பாலம்
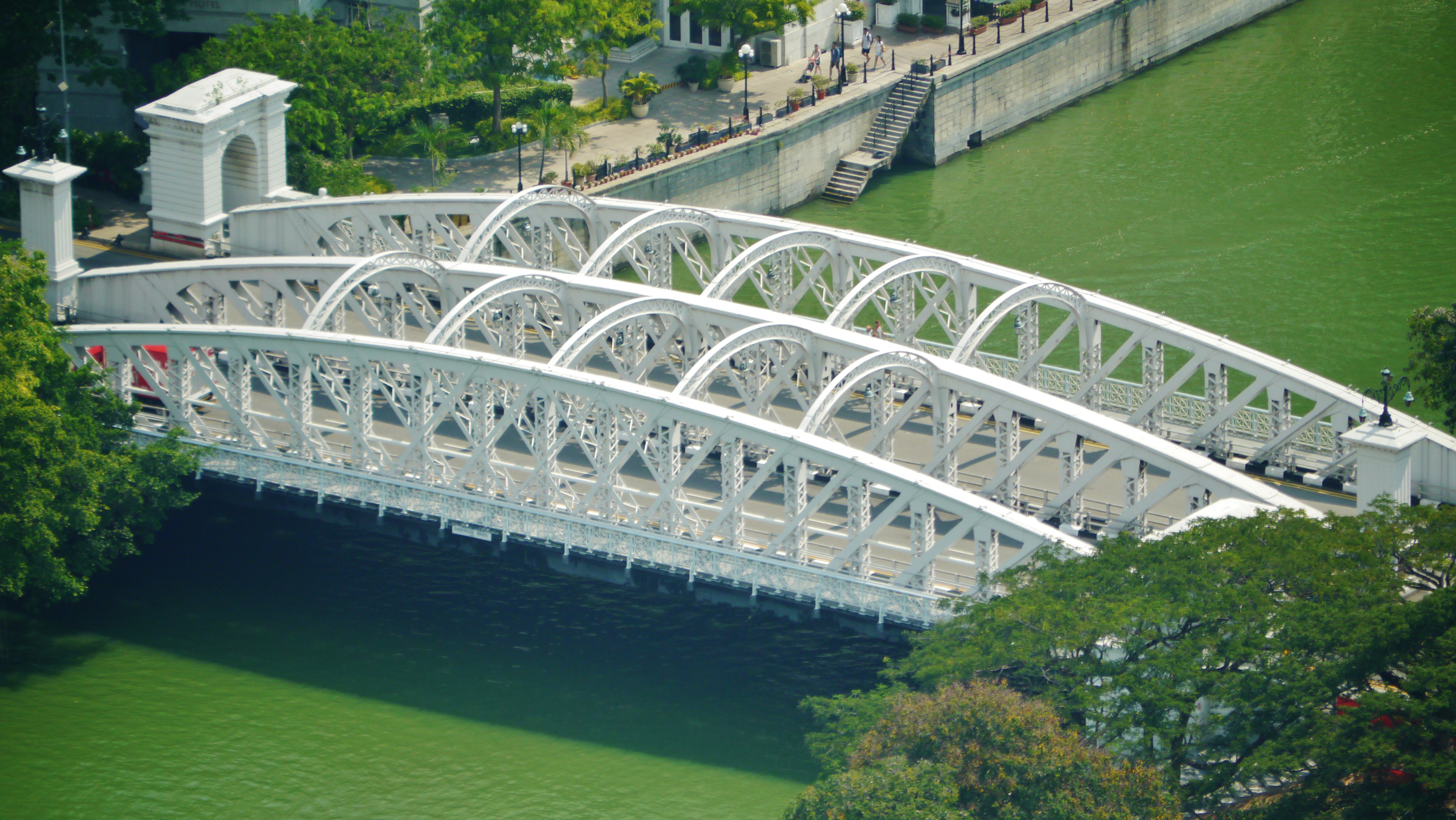
- Anderson Bridge in 2015, as seen from the Swissôtel The Stamford
- Coordinates: 1.2871833°N 103.8529398°E
- Carries: Pedestrians and bicycles (Motor vehicles in the past)
- Crosses: Singapore River
- Locale: Downtown Core, Singapore
- Official name: Anderson Bridge

Characteristics
- Design: Truss bridge
- Total length: 70 metres
- Width: 23 metres

History
- Designer: Robert Peirce
- Opened: 12 March 1910; 116 years ago

Statistics

National monument of Singapore
- Designated: 15 October 2019; 6 years ago
- Reference no.: 73

Location
- Interactive map of Anderson Bridge

Anderson Bridge is a pedestrian bridge that spans across the Singapore River. It is located near the river's mouth in the Downtown Core Planning Area of Singapore's Central Area. Originally, the Cavenagh Bridge was the only bridge made to cross the Singapore River, prompting the need for a second bridge to help reduce the traffic along Cavenagh Bridge. In 1904, a committee was formed by the Municipal Commission to research a suitable location for a second bridge, eventually settling on an area by the Singapore River's mouth.

The bridge was constructed over two years from 1908 to 1910, with the cost divided between the Commission and the British government. Two companies, Messrs. Howarth Erskine and Company and Westminster Construction Company Ltd, were given contracts for the construction, building the superstructure and the abutments, respectively. The bridge's steelworks were imported from England and a cofferdam was built to put the abutments in place. An electric crane lifted the three main girders of the bridge into place, which itself was built using a hydraulic plant.

It was opened and named after governor of the Straits Settlements Sir John Anderson on 12 March 1910. In 1986, the bridge was among eight that got refurbished. Anderson Bridge was gazetted a national monument in 2019 alongside Cavenagh and Elgin Bridge, being collectively gazetted as the Singapore River Bridges. Two years later, Anderson Bridge was converted into a pedestrian bridge, with traffic being diverted to the Esplanade Bridge instead; it has remained as such ever since.

== History ==
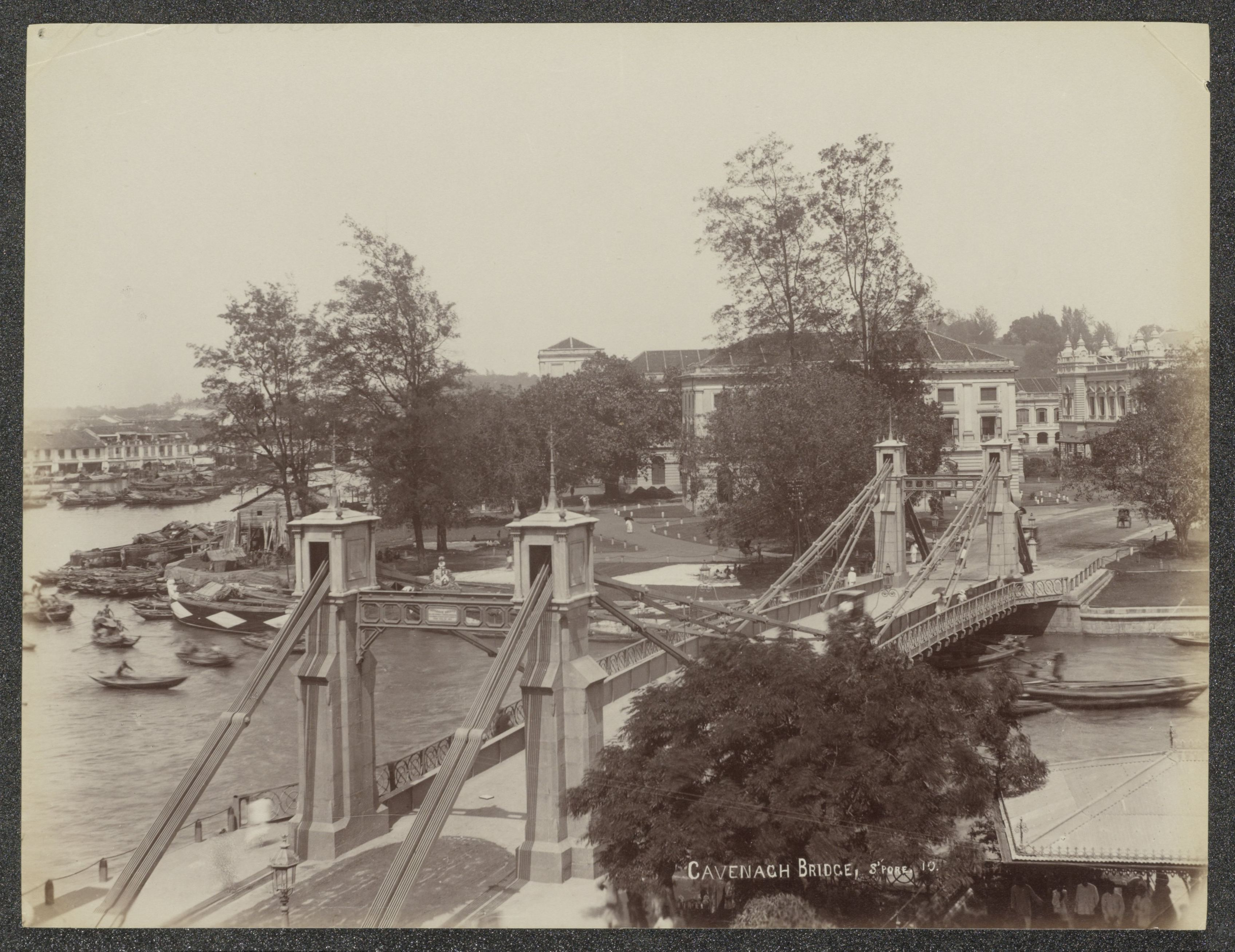
Cavenagh Bridge, c. 1870 – c. 1900

In the late 1800s, only one bridge, Cavenagh Bridge, served as the main link between the commercial area and the residential area across the Singapore River. Following an increase of both foot and vehicular traffic, a second bridge was needed to aid Cavenagh Bridge in managing the traffic across the river; Cavenagh Bridge was also too low for boats to travel under during high tide. Initial plans for a second way to cross the river had been previously discussed as early as 1901, where the results of the Singapore River Commission suggested either widening Cavenagh Bridge or building a new bridge. In 1902, municipal engineer Robert Peirce recommended the construction of a second bridge, but was unsuccessful.

It was not until 1904, when the government formed a committee consisting of Peirce, municipal commissioner A. J. W. Watkins, and acting colonial engineer F. S. B. Gaffney, (Note: Watkins and Gaffney are referred to by their last names in the source. For Watkins' initials, see this source. For Gaffney's initials, see this source.) that research for the location of the second bridge began. In the end, the committee recommended an area near the mouth of the river, which was subsequently accepted by the government. The cost of the bridge was divided between the Commission and the British government, who contributed $100,000 and $137,000, respectively. The Tramway Company contributed $3,000 as a grant for running electricity across the bridge. In October 1907, the Municipal Commission awarded the contract for the superstructure of the new bridge to Messrs. Howarth Erskine and Company, at the cost of $25,000.

=== Construction ===
Construction on the bridge began in 1908, with the bridge's design created by Peirce and D. M. Martia with supervision from H. Gostwyck. (Note: Martia and Gostwyck are referred to by their last names in the source. For Martia's initials, see this source. For Gostwyck's initials, see this source.) To help create the three main girders of the bridge, a building strengthened with a steel structure was built nearby. Once built, the girders rose to more than 30 feet (9.1 m) above the roadway. Furthermore, two abutments, created under a contract by the Westminster Construction Company Ltd, were made to position the girders. The abutments required the construction of a cofferdam, consisting of guide piles that were driven into the riverbed for the cofferdam's sheeting.

On the southern side, due to several loose boulders above bedrock, precautions were made to either prevent the water from leaking through or prevent the weight from pushing the cofferdam out into the river. To further avoid the loose ground, stout piles were added to help stabilise the land. Once the completed girders were added, the Westminster Construction Company Ltd constructed the remaining footpaths, roadways, designs in the arches, and other general maintenance work. Archways were constructed with granite that had grooves at each joint, further including moulded copings and a bronze lion on the top of each archway. (Note: The lions would later be omitted for financial reasons.) Portals that extended from the road to the top of the copings were added, which were 23 by 9 feet (7.0 m × 2.7 m), while the roadways were 31.6 feet (9.6 m) wide and supported by fixed cantilevers.

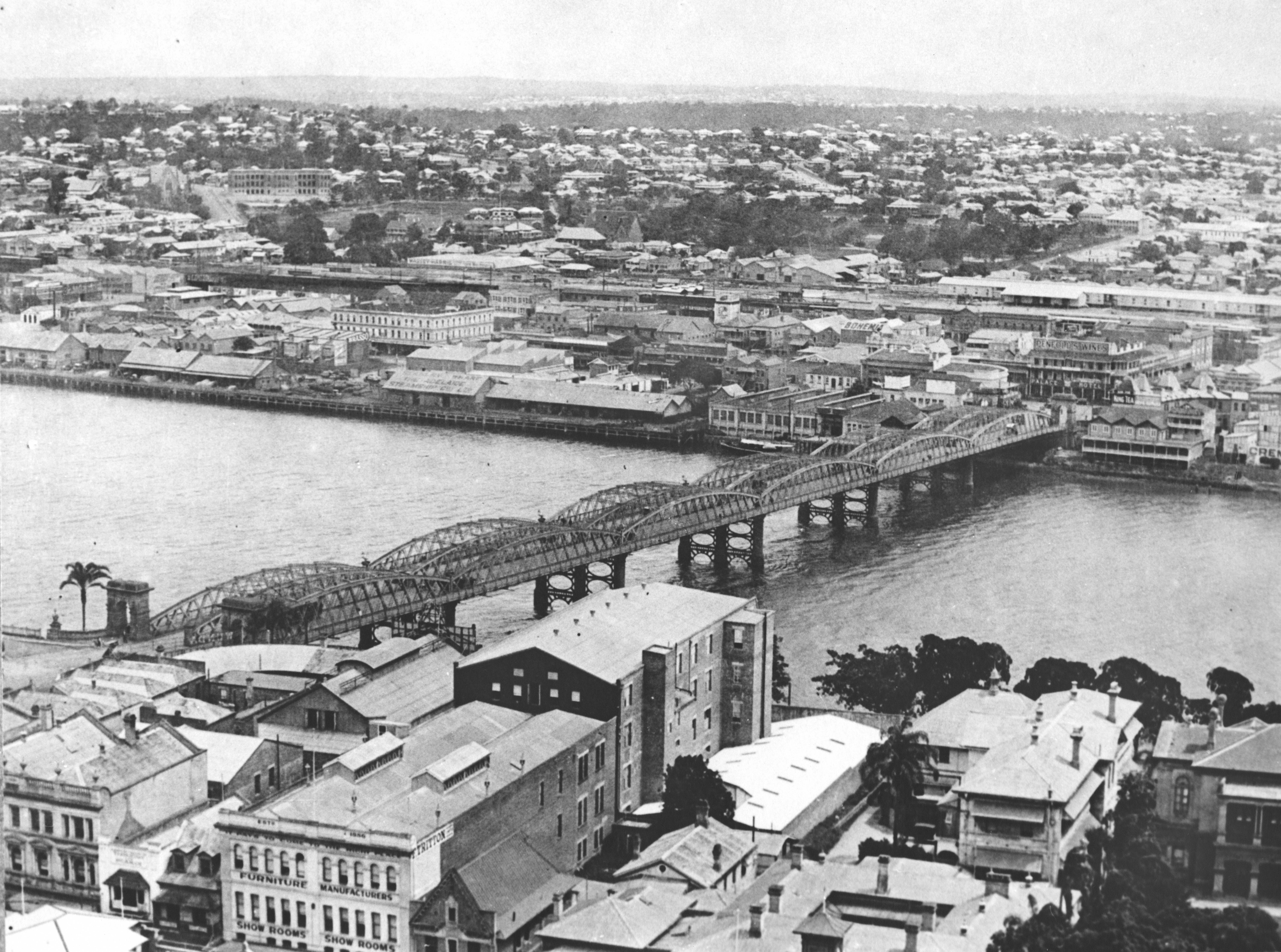
The Victoria Bridge, c. 1933

Lines for electric trams to travel across the bridge were also added; the lines connected the trams from Johnston's Pier to Government House. The bridge was constructed with either bow string or Linville truss design principles and was described to have looked similar to the Victoria Bridge in Brisbane, Australia. The three girdles, which were 204 feet (62 m) long and 200 feet (61 m) apart from their centres, were placed on their bottom booms. Steel cross-shaped girders, which were placed in between the main girders, had steel joints and T-bars to reinforce them as the roadway's flooring plates were placed on them. Footways for pedestrian use extended on either side of the main girders and were supported by steel cantilevers.

The steelwork of the bridge was imported from England in small sections and unloaded by a steam travelling crane. The crane would bring the steelwork to the site to be lifted into position by an electric crane which ran on rails. Hydraulics were used to rivet the steel together to create the main girders, which had been bolted together beforehand. A hydraulic plant was built on site by Messrs. Howarth Erskine and Company for this purpose.

=== Opening and subsequent use ===
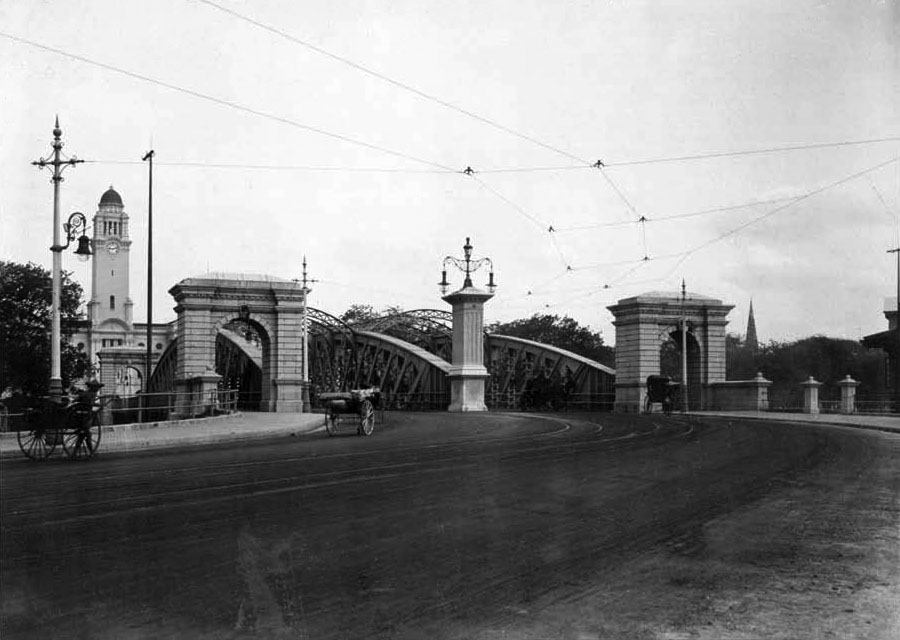
Anderson Bridge, c. 1914

The bridge was completed in 1910. It was decided to be named Anderson Bridge, after the governor of the Straits Settlements and high commissioner for the Federated Malay States Sir John Anderson, who officially opened the bridge on 12 March 1910; it had been suggested to be named after Anderson as early as 1908, as Cavenagh Bridge was also named after a Governor.

During the Japanese occupation, the severed heads of criminals were hung on Anderson Bridge as a warning to discourage citizens from breaking the law. In 1986, national development minister Teh Cheang Wan announced that Anderson Bridge would be among eight bridges that would be refurbished. In the 1990s, due to the increasing vehicular traffic flow between the northern and southern banks of the Singapore River, the Esplanade Bridge was built to provide faster access between Marina Centre and the financial district of Shenton Way. Construction of the 260-metre-long (850 ft) bridge in front of the mouth of the Singapore River began in early 1994 and was completed in 1997.

On 3 November 2008, the bridge was selected for conservation as part of the Urban Redevelopment Authority's expanded conservation programme. The bridge has been a part of Singapore's Formula One circuit, the Marina Bay Street Circuit, since it was introduced in 2008. On 15 October 2019, the National Heritage Board (NHB) gazetted Anderson Bridge, Cavenagh Bridge, and Elgin Bridge collectively as the Singapore River Bridges, becoming the 73rd national monument of Singapore. This was first announced by deputy prime minister Heng Swee Keat on 3 August 2019, where he stated that the Padang and the Singapore River Bridges would be included as future national monuments. On 5 November 2021, authorities announced the conversion of Anderson Bridge to full pedestrian use from the end December 2021 to increase the Civic District's walkability. Following Anderson Bridge's official conversion to a pedestrian bridge, vehicles that wanted to cross the river were diverted to the Esplanade Bridge instead.

== Description ==
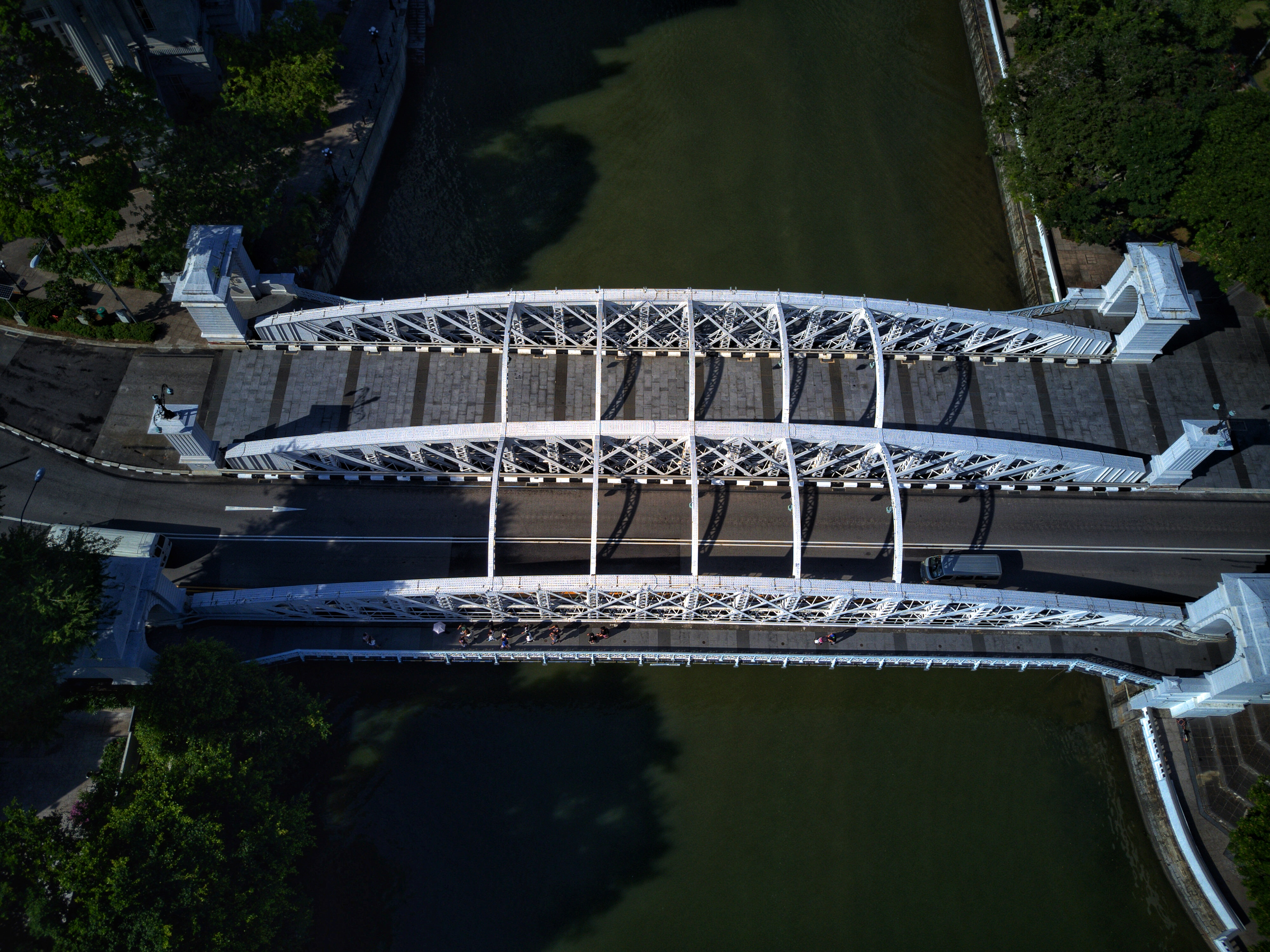
An aerial view of Anderson Bridge, 2018

Anderson Bridge is made up of three large girders which hold the bridge up. Two of the girders are placed on opposite sides of the bridge with one in the middle, allowing for two separate roadways on the bridge that help to regulate traffic. There are four arches at the end of the two concrete footpaths, each of them made of granite and has a bracket to hold a gas lamp. The footpaths themselves are held up by cantilevers and were initially built to separate vehicle traffic from pedestrian traffic. The bridge has railings, rainwater channels, gully frames, and covers, all of which were made at the Municipal Workshop in River Valley. Gas and water lines, electric cables, and telephone wires were run under the roadway. The bridge's total length is 70 metres (230 ft), while its width is 23 metres (75 ft).

Following Anderson Bridge's gazetting as a national monument, the NHB launched the Milestones Through Monuments programme, where public installation art was erected at the Singapore River Bridges. Anderson Bridge's installation art was a life-sized tram model that represented the trams that formerly ran along the bridge. It was designed by EXD Lab. An inscribed stone from Aswan, Egypt, was imported and placed on the bridge facing the Victoria Memorial Hall. The Merlion Park (now known as the Waterboat House Garden) was formerly located next to the Anderson Bridge at the mouth of the Singapore River. The park, which had the Merlion statue, was built in 1972 before it was moved in 2001 to the present Merlion Park, with the park near Anderson Bridge renamed to the Waterboat House Garden. Following its gazetting as a national monument, a plaque was added to the bridge which states:

Named after Sir John Anderson, Governor of the Straits Settlement (1904–1911), Anderson Bridge was built between 1908 [and] 1909 to take vehicular load off Cavenagh Bridge. It served traffic along the seafront, connecting Empress Place to Collyer Quay. The bridge was constructed with three steel arches and supporting steel girders to accommodate vehicles and electric trams. Its neoclassical style features rusticated archways and a fluted pier at each end. A red granite plaque imported from Aswan, Egypt, presented as part of the opening ceremony, is fixed at the end of the central girder.

== Gallery ==
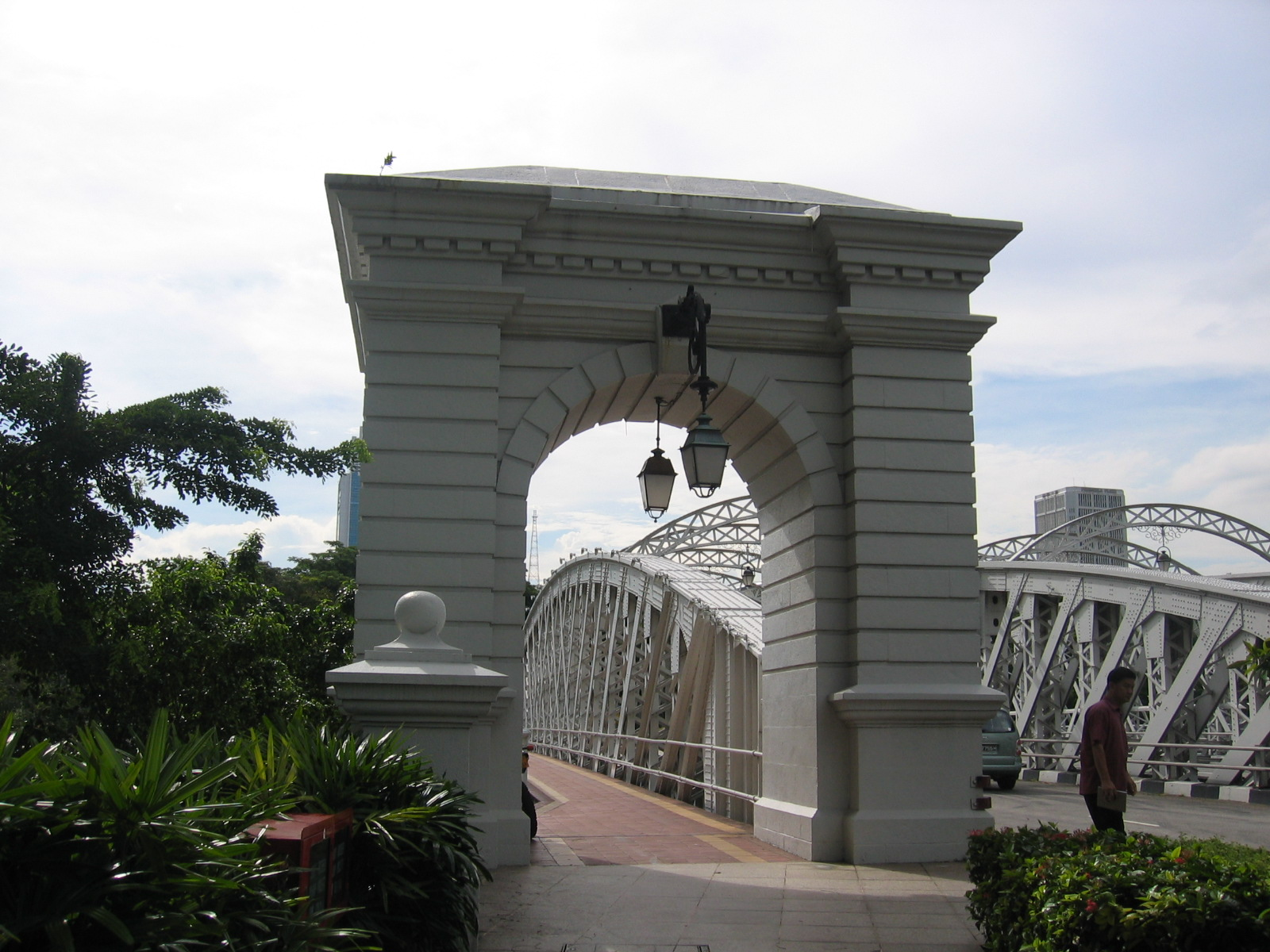
One of the arches at the end of the footpaths.

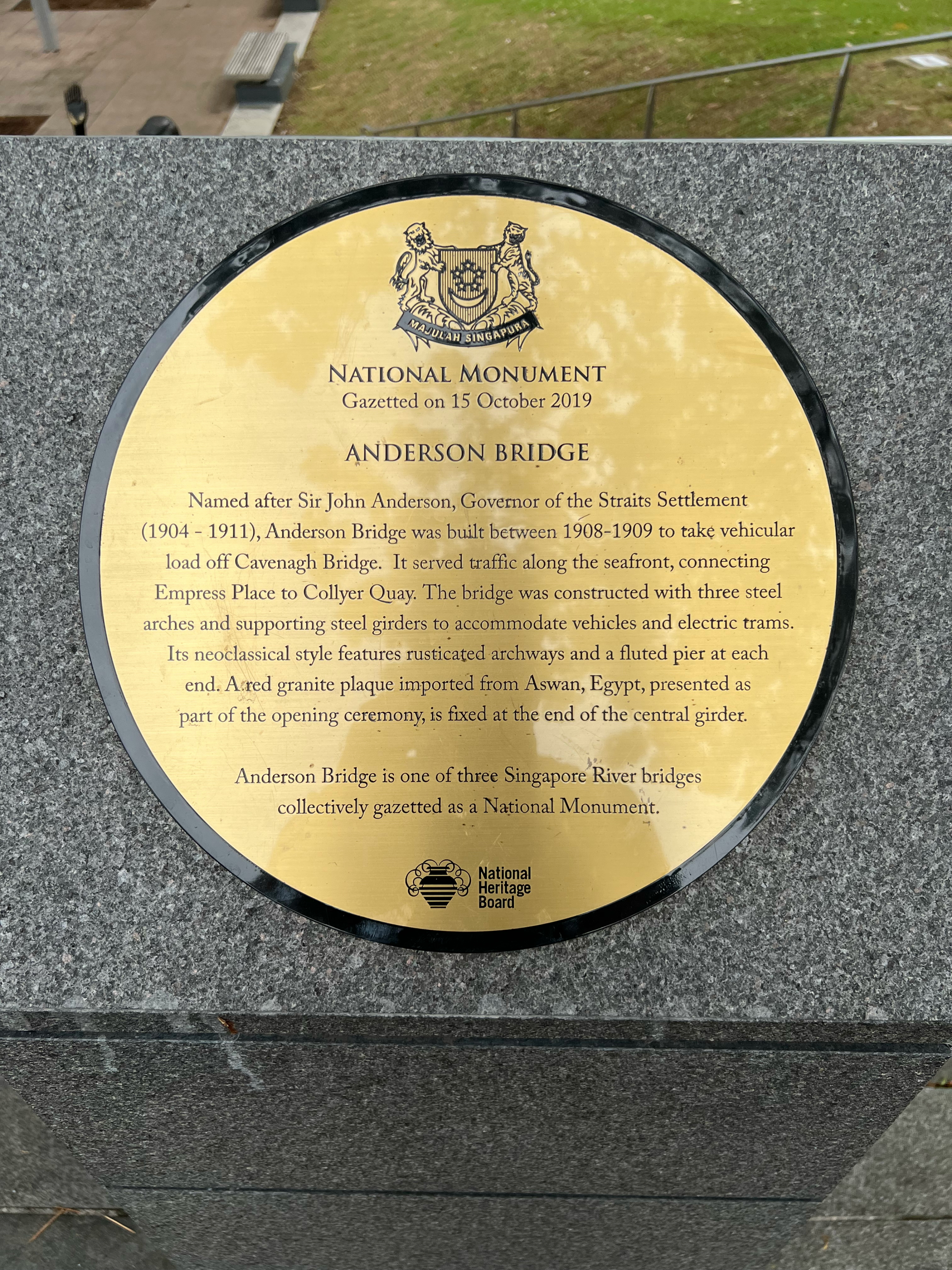
Plaque marking Anderson Bridge as a National Monument.

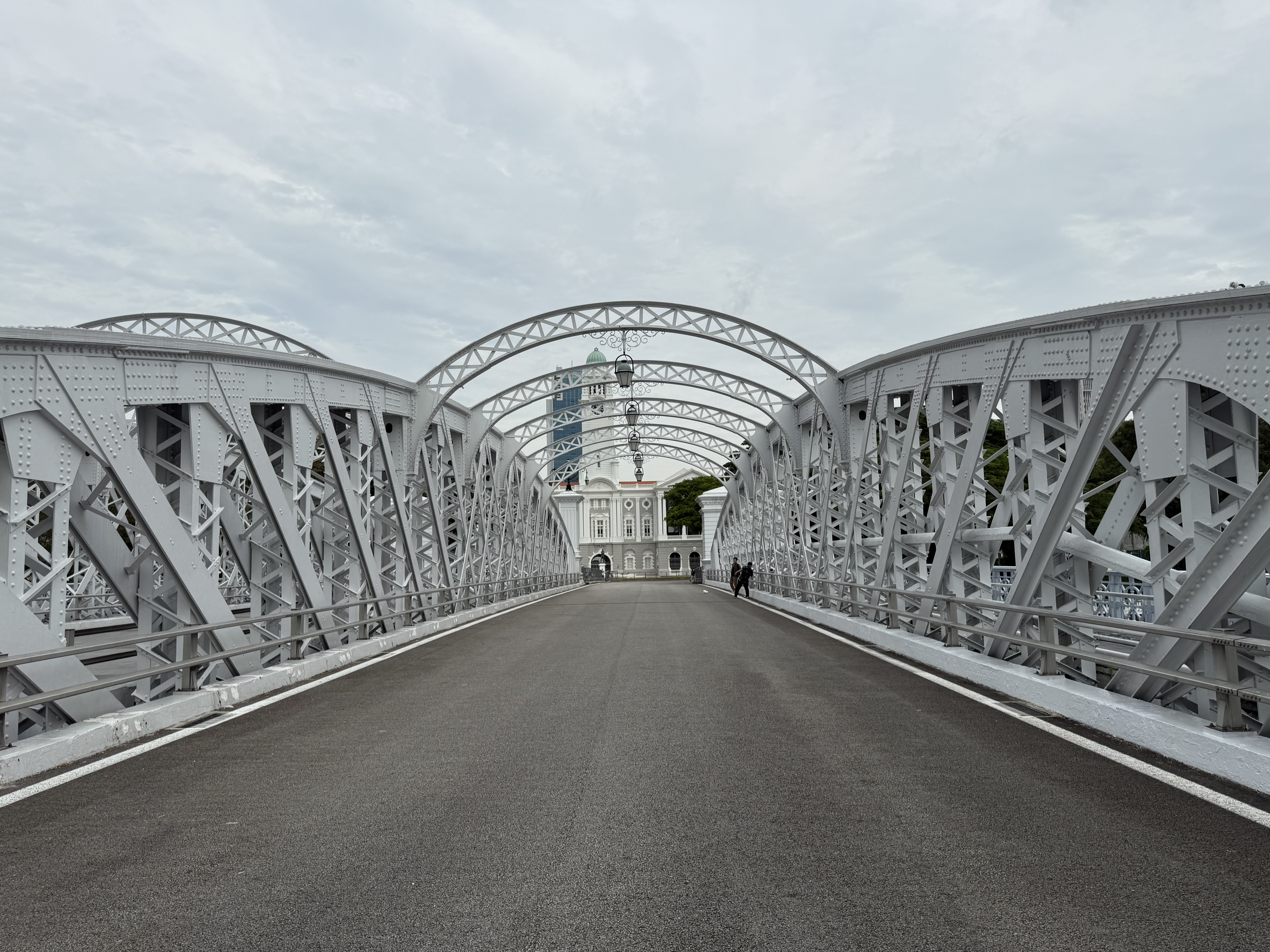
View of the bridge's girders at the center-line.

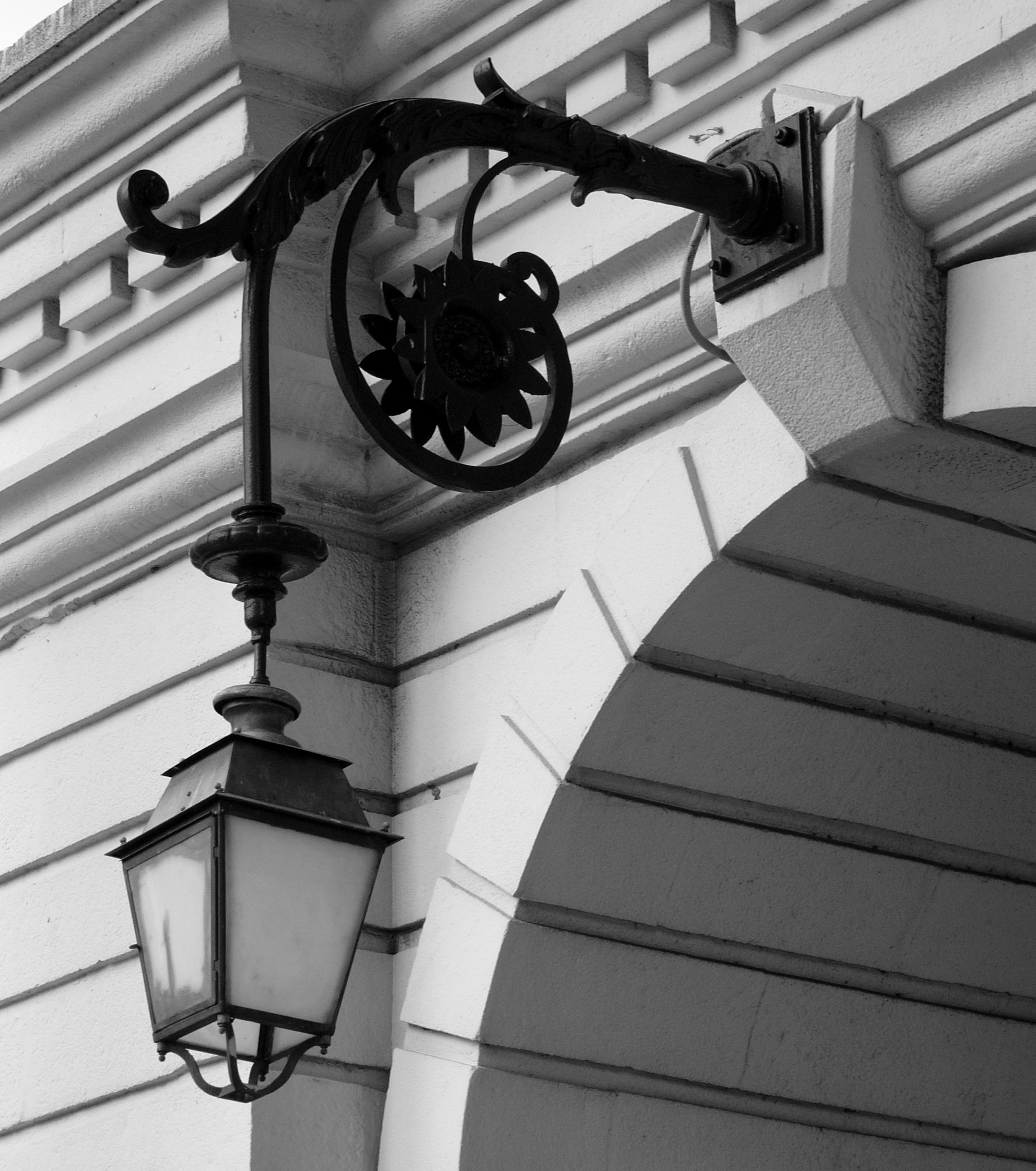
Closeup of one of the lanterns on the arches.

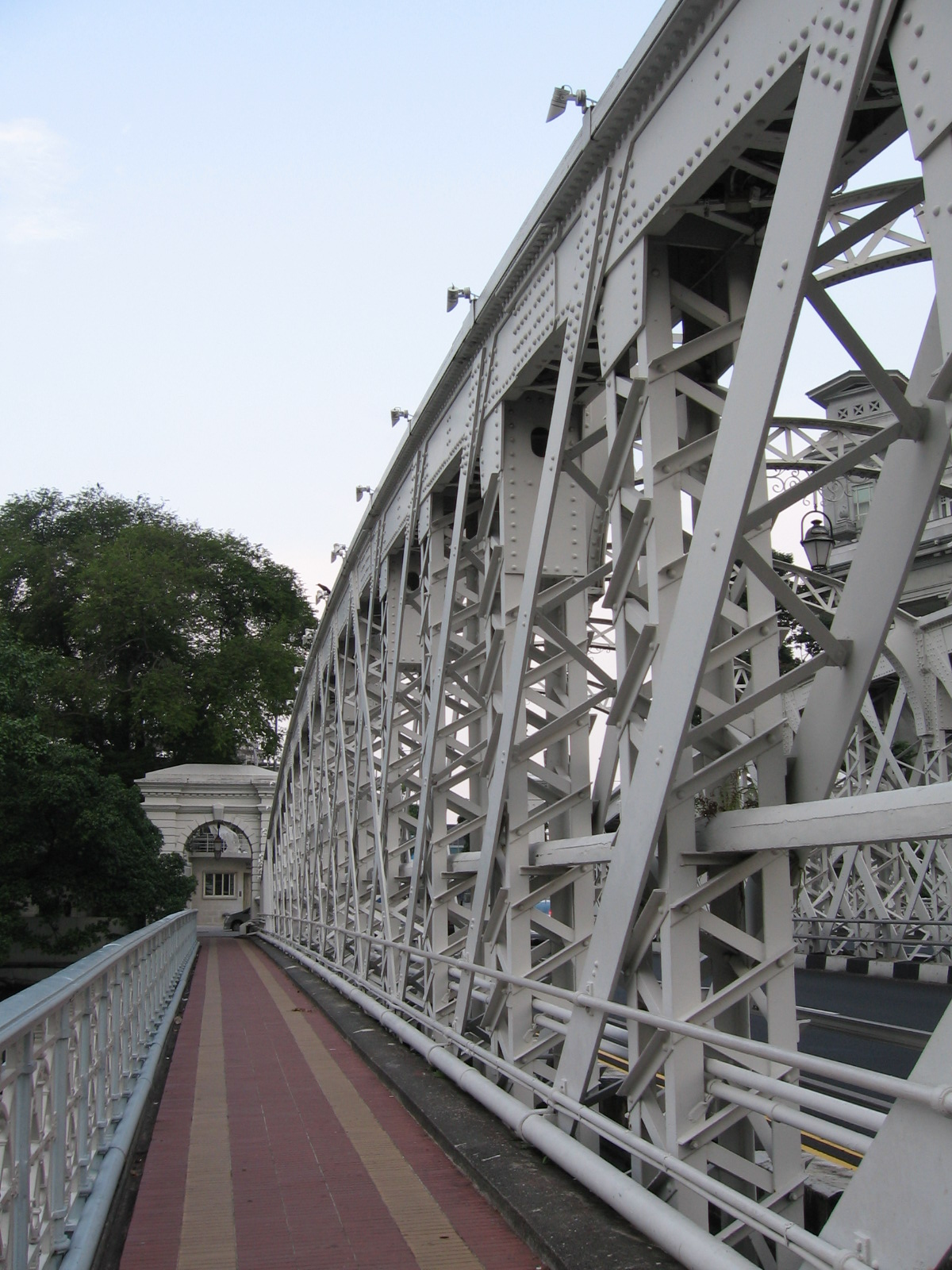
View of the girder from the footpath.

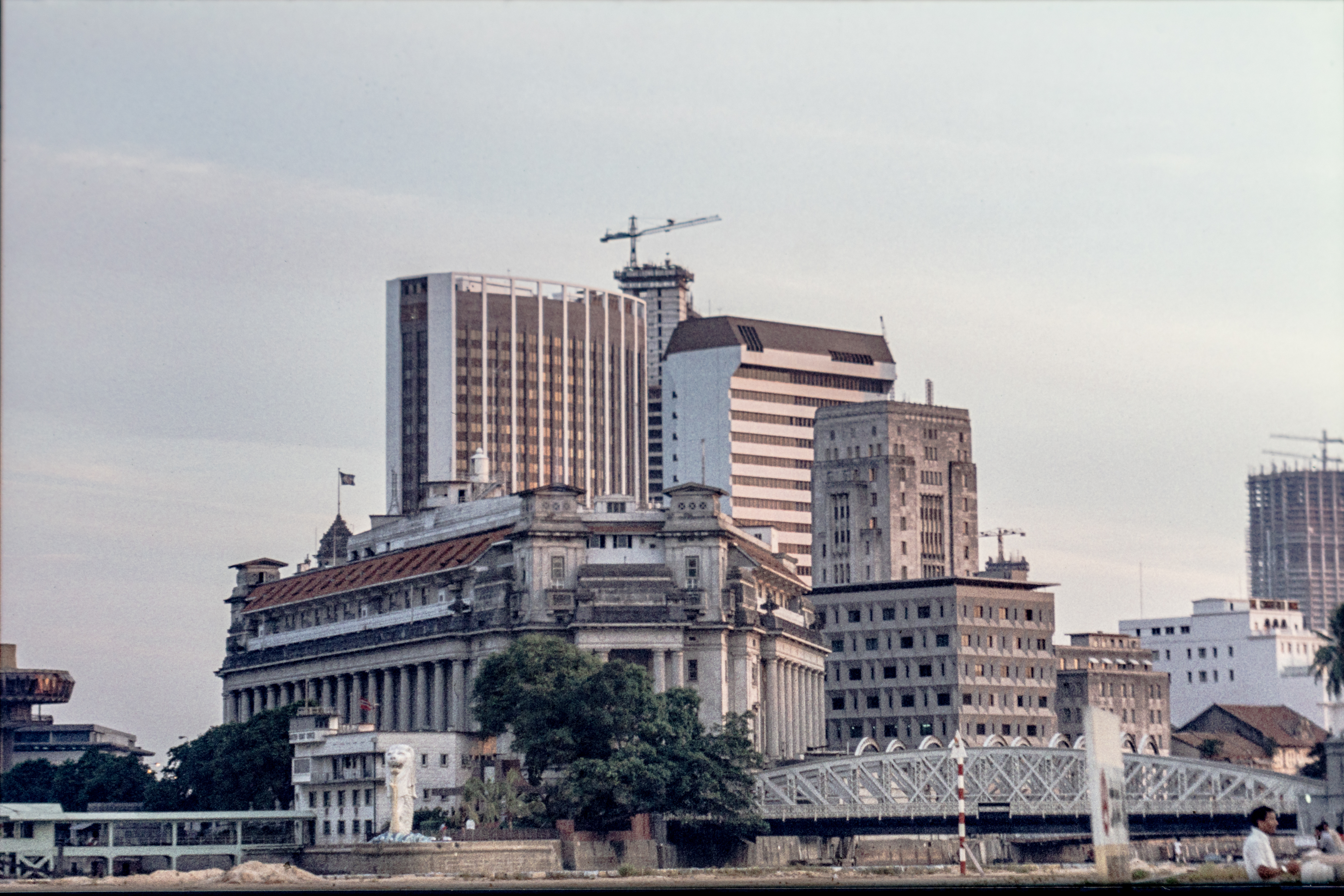
The Anderson Bridge (right) next to the former Merlion Park.

A 1932 film of Singapore; the Anderson Bridge appears at 1:16.

== See also ==
- List of bridges in Singapore
- National monuments of Singapore
