= Fullerton Hotel =

Fullerton Hotel may refer to:

- The Fullerton Hotel Singapore
- The Fullerton Waterboat House, Singapore
- Fullerton Bay Hotel, Singapore
- The Fullerton Ocean Park Hotel, Nam Long Shan, Hong Kong
