= Dancing Girl =

Dancing Girl may refer to:

- "The Dancing Girl" (short story), an 1890 short story by the Japanese writer Mori Ogai
- The Dancing Girl (film), a lost American 1915 silent film drama
- Dancing Girl, a 1957 Japanese film directed by Hiroshi Shimizu
- The Dancing Girl, an 1891 play by Henry Arthur Jones
- Dancing Girl (Rabindranath Tagore), a 1905 painting by Rabindranath Tagore
- Dancing Girl (Maihime), fictional work by Yasunari Kawabata based on the life of Olga Sapphire
- The Dancing Girl (sculpture in Warsaw), a 1927 statue in Warsaw, Poland
- Dancing Girl (Singapore sculpture)
- Dancing Girl (prehistoric sculpture), a bronze statuette dating around 2500 BC from the Indus Valley Civilisation

== See also ==
- Dancing Girls (disambiguation)
- Performers of the nautch, a popular court dance in India
