= Dancing Girls =

Dancing Girls may refer to:

- Dancing Girls (book), 1977 collection of short stories by Margaret Atwood
- Dancing Girls (song), 1984 single by Nik Kershaw
- Dancing Girls (1896 film), British silent short film
- Make It Happen (film), 2008 American film, known in France as Dancing Girls

== See also ==
- Dancing Girl (disambiguation)
- Women in dance
