= Lim Nang Seng =

Singaporean sculptor

- 林浪新
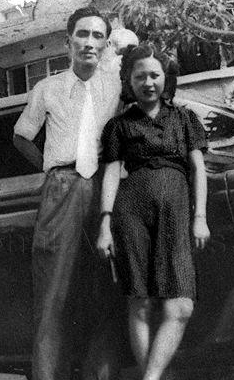
- Lim (left) with his wife in 1950
- Born: 1917; Kuching, Sarawak, British Borneo (present-day Malaysia)
- Died: 17 November 1987 (aged 69–70); Singapore General Hospital, Singapore
- Occupation: Sculptor
- Known for: Dancing Girl; Merlion Park

Lim Nang Seng (1917 – 17 November 1987, Chinese: 林浪新) was a Singaporean sculptor. He sculpted the Merlion statue in Merlion Park.

== Biography ==
Lim was born in 1917 in Kuching, Sarawak. Lim originally worked as a schoolteacher. Sculpting initially began as a hobby of his, which he later turned into his career. In 1967, Lim held the first sculpture show in Singapore with five other sculptors, and designed the 1967 Singapore coin collection. Prior to 1971, he had spent two weeks in a carpark along Orchard Road sculpting Dancing Girl, a sculpture, which was then installed at the Seng Poh Garden in Tiong Bahru. The sculpture received mixed reception from the local residents, as some thought it was too abstract or too closely resembled a swan. However, Lim was not upset by this, as he believed that swans were prosperous animals. In 1970, he won three prizes in a handicraft and design exhibition. In 1971, Lim began hosting sculpting lessons, teaching women how to sculpt.

In 1971, Lim was selected to sculpt the Merlion statue in the Merlion Park along the Singapore River. Work on the sculpture began in November 1971 and ended in August 1972. It involved all eight of his children. In 1975, Lim was among several local artists whose work was presented in China by S. Rajaratnam.

However, Lim did not want his children to follow in his footsteps, as he did not earn much money from sculpting.

== Personal life ==
On 17 November 1987, during the Merlion Week, while working on clay figurines, Lim fainted and was admitted into the Singapore General Hospital. At the hospital, Lim underwent surgery, which was unsuccessful, and died at 5.55pm.
