= Elgin Bridge (Singapore) =

Bridge in Central Area, Singapore

Elgin Bridge Jambatan Elgin 爱琴桥 எல்ஜின் பாலம்
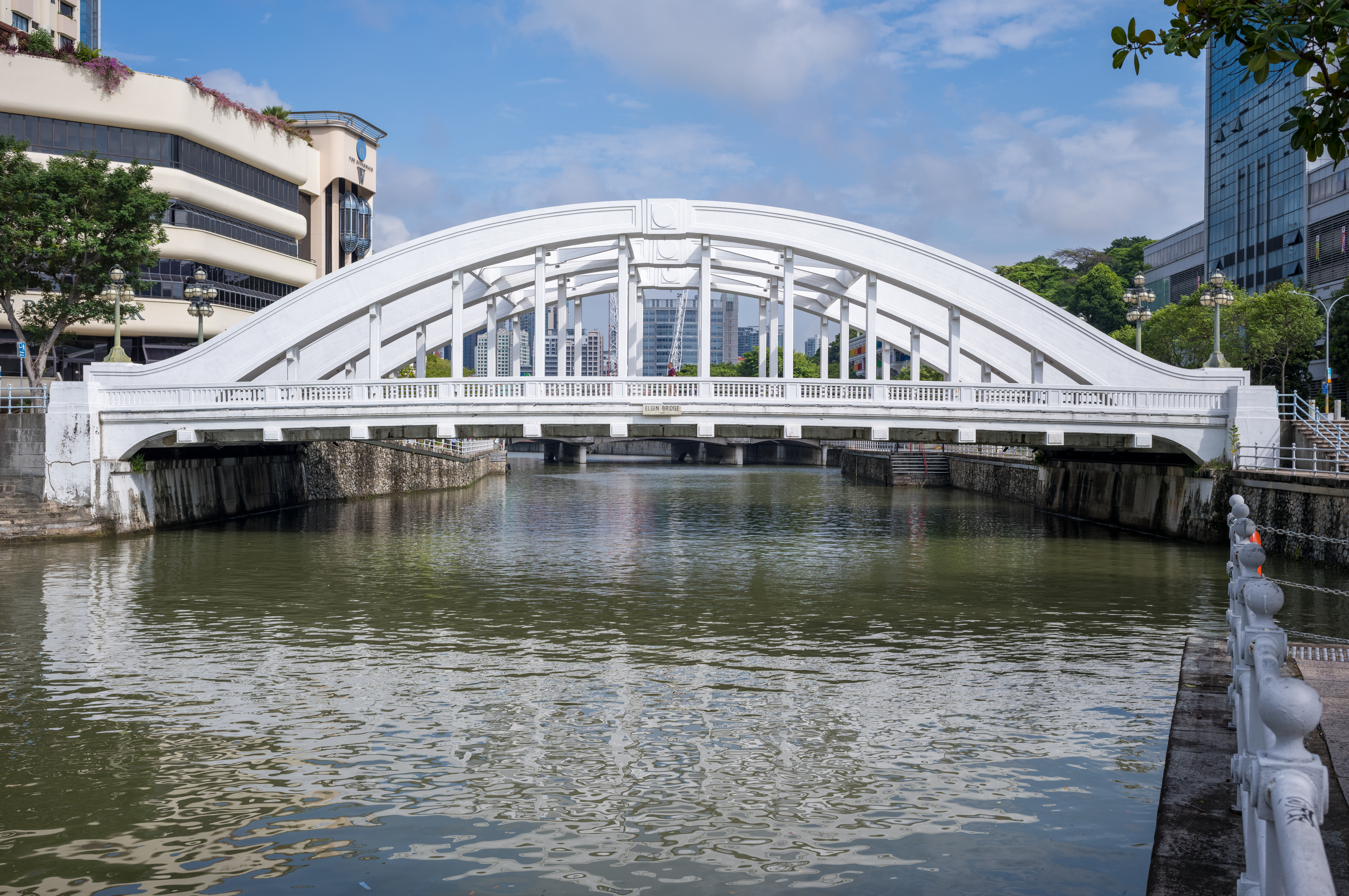
- Elgin Bridge in August 2023
- Coordinates: 1.289113°N 103.849294°E
- Carries: Motor vehicles and pedestrians
- Crosses: Singapore River
- Locale: Downtown Core–Singapore River Planning Area, Singapore
- Official name: Elgin Bridge

Characteristics
- Design: Arch bridge
- Total length: 46 metres
- Width: 25 metres

History
- Opened: 30 May 1929; 97 years ago

Statistics

National monument of Singapore
- Designated: 15 October 2019; 6 years ago
- Reference no.: 73

Location
- Interactive map of Elgin Bridge

Elgin Bridge is a vehicular box girder bridge across the Singapore River, linking the Downtown Core to the Singapore River Planning Area located within Singapore's Central Area. It was built between 1925 and 1929.

The bridge was named after James Bruce, 8th Earl of Elgin in 1862, a colonial administrator and diplomat who had served as Governor General of Canada and India. The iron bridge built across the river had previously replaced an older wooden bridge. The current bridge that still stands today was built in 1929. As this was the first permanent bridge across the river, the two roads leading to it were named North Bridge Road and South Bridge Road accordingly.

== History ==
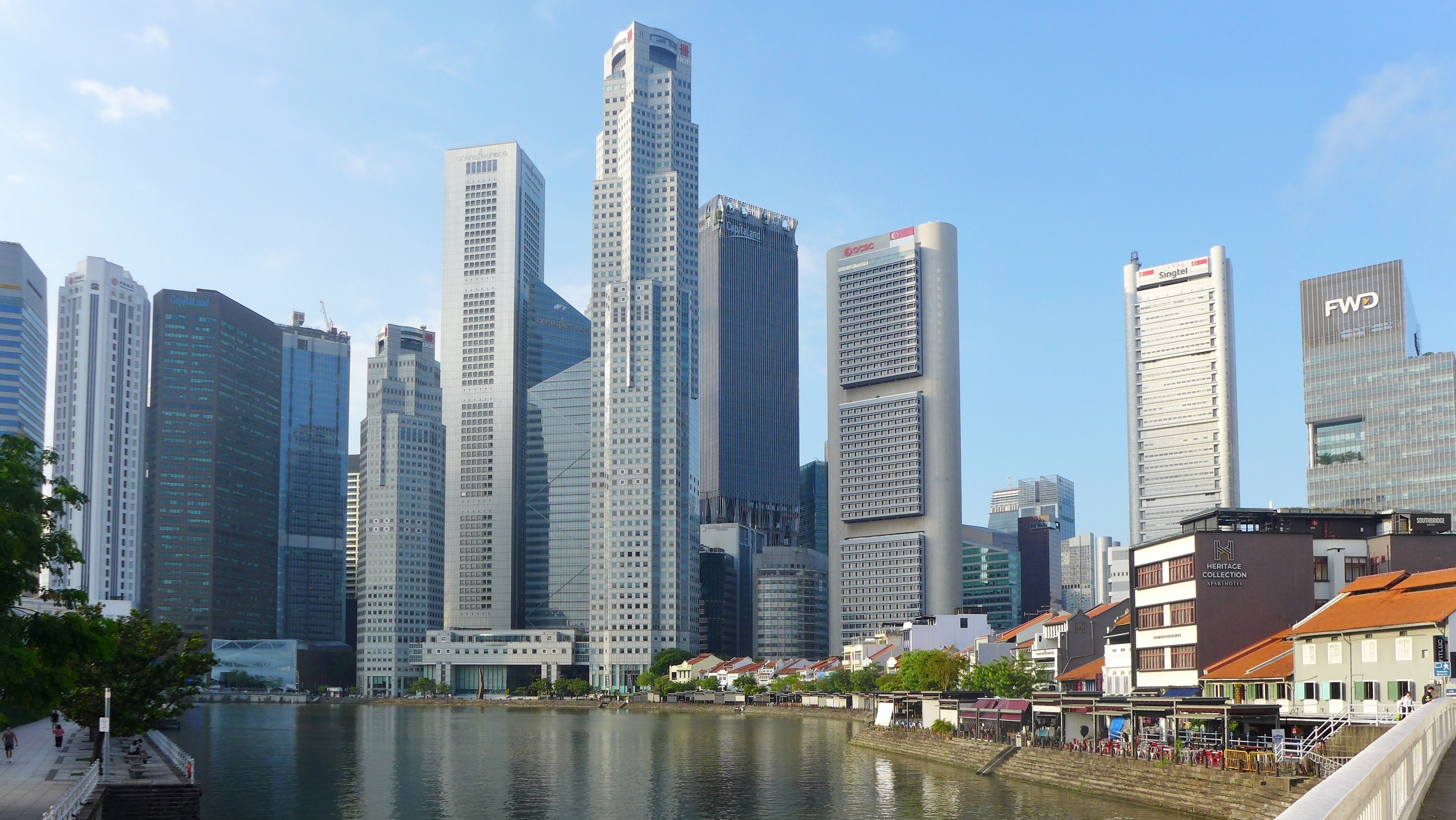
The skyline from Elgin Bridge

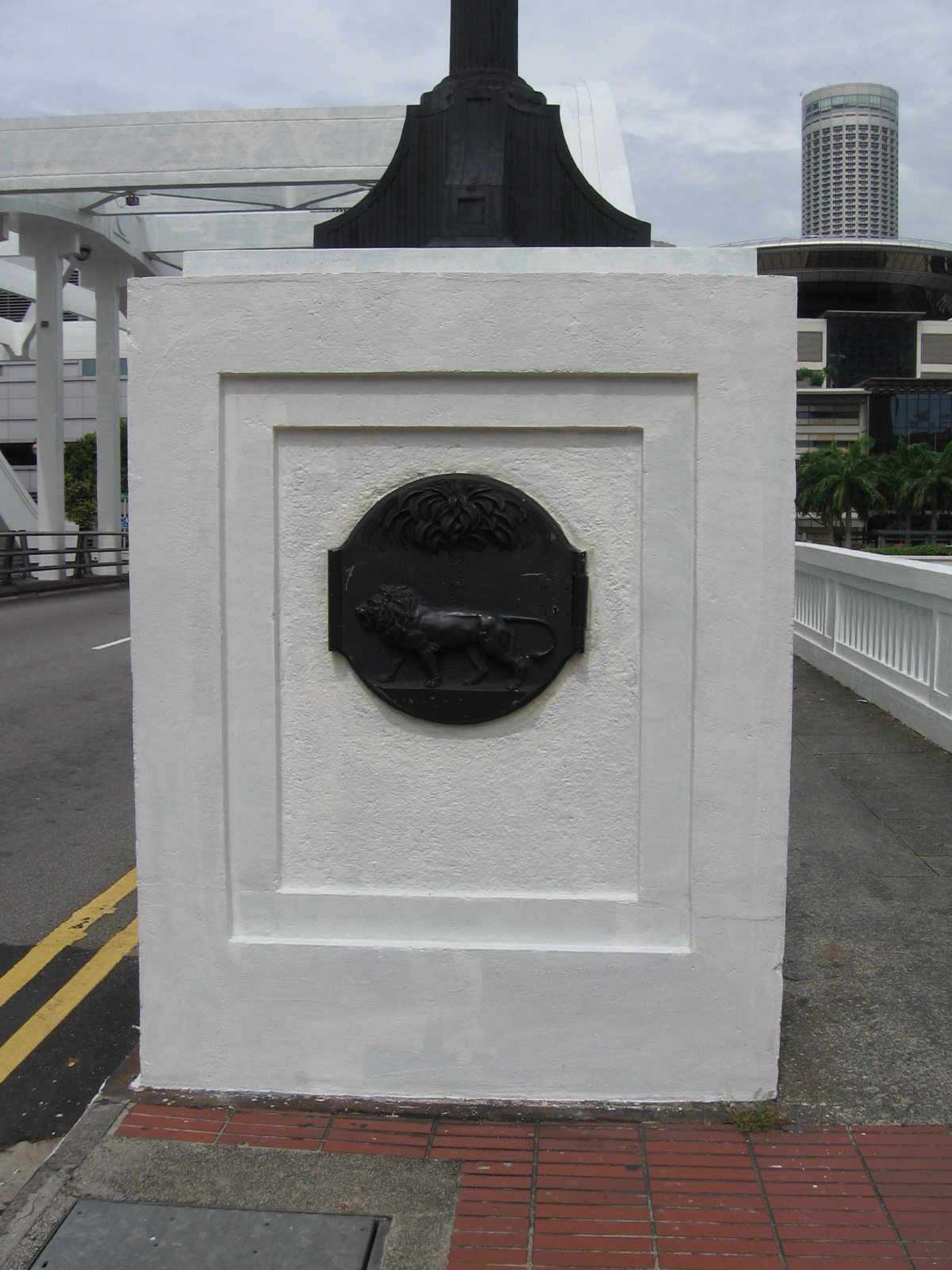
The crest of the Singapore Municipal Commission at one end of Elgin Bridge, Singapore.

In 1819, Sir Thomas Stamford Raffles landed on Singapore and founded the colony. Raffles issued an instruction on 25 June 1819 that a bridge be built as soon as possible across the Singapore River so that it may link a town planned for the Chinese community on the southern side of the river to another intended for the Malays on the northern side.

In 1822, a wooden footbridge was built under the direction of Lieutenant Philip Jackson and it was officially named Presentment Bridge. It was also known as Jackson's Bridge and Monkey Bridge.

In 1844, a wooden footbridge built by John Turnbull Thomson replaced the older bridge, and was named Thomson's Bridge. This was demolished in 1862; in its place an iron bridge was built and named Elgin Bridge after the 8th Earl of Elgin, Viceroy of India. It was widened in the 1870s. In 1925 the iron bridge had to make way for a new concrete bridge, which was opened to traffic by Sir Hugh Clifford, the Governor of the Straits Settlements, on 30 May 1929.

Cavaliere Rudolfo Nolli, an Italian sculptor, designed the cast iron lamps on both sides of the bridge. His signature is inscribed beneath the lamps. Bronze plaques, each with a lion standing in front of a royal palm tree engraved on it, can also be found below the lamps.

On 3 November 2008, the bridge was selected for conservation as part of the Urban Redevelopment Authority's expanded conservation programme.

On 15 October 2019, the National Heritage Board gazetted the Elgin Bridge, along with Anderson Bridge and Cavenagh Bridge (collectively known as the Singapore River Bridges) as the 73rd National Monument of Singapore. This was first announced by Deputy Prime Minister Heng Swee Keat on 3 August 2019, where the Padang is included as a future National Monument.

== See also ==
- List of bridges in Singapore
