= Dancing Girl (Singapore sculpture) =

Sculpture in the Seng Poh Garden in Tiong Bahru, Singapore

Coordinates: 1.2837°N 103.8307°E

- Artist: Lim Nang Seng
- Year: 1972
- Medium: Concrete
- Subject: Abstract dancing girl
- Dimensions: 1.2 m (3 ft 11 in)
- Location: Seng Poh Garden, Tiong Bahru, Singapore

The Dancing Girl is a sculpture in the Seng Poh Garden in Tiong Bahru, Singapore. It was the first public art piece in Tiong Bahru.

== History ==
Dancing Girl was sculpted by local sculptor Lim Nang Seng following an urgent commission from then member of parliament for Tiong Bahru, Ch'ng Jit Koon, who wanted the Seng Poh Garden to be given greater prominence. As the commission was urgent, Lim chose to sculpt an abstract sculpture, featuring a girl doing a joyful harvest dance. The sculpture cost $2,000 and was sculpted in a carpark along Orchard Road for two weeks, and unveiled by then Minister for Interior and Defence Lim Kim San. The sculpture was initially met with mixed reception from the local residents of the area, some of whom believed that the sculpture too closely resembled a swan taking flight. However, Lim was not upset over the criticisms, as he believed that swans were auspicious birds, and thought that it was fine since he believed that those residents would think that the sculpture would bring prosperity to the estate.

The sculpture was included in the Tiong Bahru Heritage Trail by the National Heritage Board.
