= Esplanade Bridge =

Bridge in Singapore

Esplanade Bridge Jambatan Esplanade 滨海桥 முற்றவெளிபாலம்
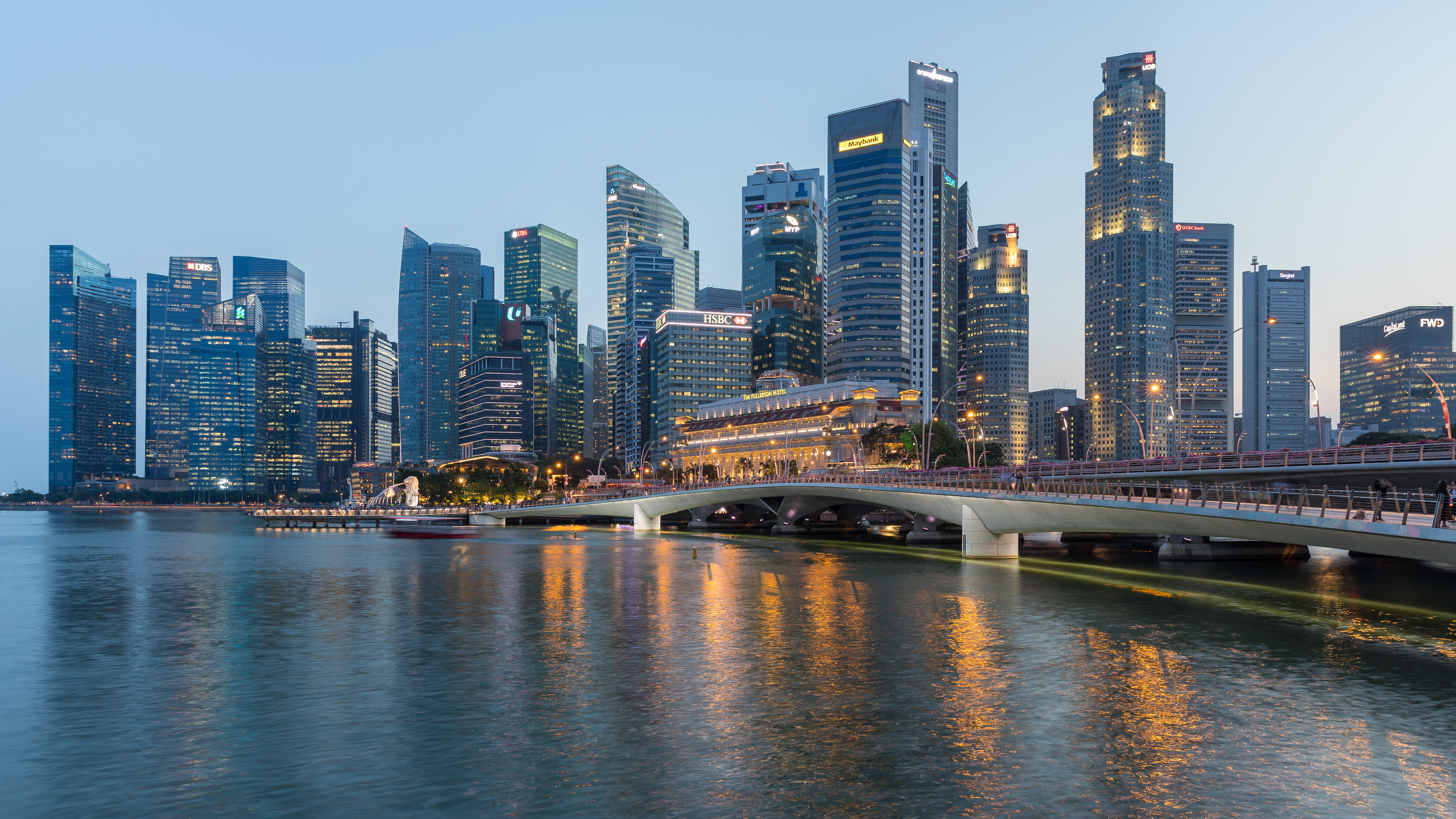
- Coordinates: 1°17′16″N 103°51′14″E
- Carries: Motor vehicles and pedestrians
- Crosses: Marina Bay
- Locale: Downtown Core, Singapore
- Official name: Esplanade Bridge

Characteristics
- Design: Arch bridge
- Total length: 280 m (919 ft.)
- Width: 46 m (150 ft.)

History
- Constructed by: Obayashi Corporation
- Opened: 1997

The Esplanade Bridge is a 261-metre-long (850 ft.) road bridge that spans across the mouth of the Singapore River in Singapore with the Esplanade - Theatres on the Bay on its northern abutment and the Merlion on the southern. The 70 metre-wide (230 ft.) low-level concrete arched bridge has seven spans and supports two four-lane carriageways and walkways along both sides.

The bridge was built to provide faster vehicular access between Marina Centre and the financial district of Shenton Way and to displace traffic from St Andrew's Road and Connaught Drive. Construction of the bridge began in early 1994 and was completed in March 1997. Service 501 is the first bus route to pass by the Esplanade Bridge. On 10 July 1999, the right turn from Hill Street to Bras Basah Road is prohibited, and motorists had to use High Street and Parliament Place, together with the St Andrew's Road. The main contractor was Obayashi Corporation while the street lamps were designed by Light Cibles. The bridge then blocked views of the Merlion statue from the Marina Bay waterfront, raising a need for the original Merlion statue to be relocated from the back to the front of the bridge.

== Occasional road closures ==
The bridge offers panoramic views of Marina South and the rest of Marina Bay. However, this also makes it subject to occasional road closures on special occasions, where the bridge closes to all road traffic to allow spectators and pedestrians to observe fireworks seen during the National Day celebrations, New Year's Eve and the Singapore Fireworks Celebrations. On these nights, the bridge is usually full of onlookers. The street lights on the bridge are usually turned off before the fireworks start, and turned on after their completion.

The bridge also forms part of the Singapore Grand Prix's Marina Bay Street Circuit, which debuted on 28 September 2008, and therefore has to be completely closed for the duration of the racing weekend.

== Jubilee Bridge ==
The Jubilee Bridge is a bridge that is being built east of Esplanade Bridge in Singapore, which is meant to displace pedestrian traffic from Esplanade Bridge. It is located in the lower parts of the Singapore River near the Esplanade Bridge. It was opened on 29 March 2015, for the passing of Lee Kuan Yew.

The bridge was first announced in 2009 and construction began in 2012. National Development Minister Khaw Boon Wan noted that the construction of such a bridge had been suggested by the late Mr Lee himself, during a 2004 visit to Marina Bay. Then, the bridge was too narrow and he thought the friendlier connection is needed. It was officially opened in November 2015.

The bridge is a prestressed concrete bridge based on joists, intended for pedestrians and cyclists. The bridge is to relieve the Esplanade Bridge, which runs along it, and has only very narrow sidewalks. It was built for the 50th anniversary of the independence of Singapore (1965).

== In popular culture ==
The bridge is featured in HBO series Westworld, as part of the third season.

== See also ==
- Anderson Bridge (Singapore)
- Benjamin Sheares Bridge
- List of bridges in Singapore
