= Wenya =

- Subzone of Jurong West Planning Area

Other transcription(s)
  - Chinese: 文雅
  - Pinyin: Wényǎ
- Country: Singapore
- Region: West Region
- Planning Area: Jurong West

Area
  - Total: 1.97 km^{2} (0.76 sq mi)

Population (2026)
  - Total: 8,060
  - Density: 4,090/km^{2} (10,600/sq mi)

Wenya (previously named as Bulim (Note: The "2011 Master Plan" (PDF). Archived from the original (PDF) on 17 July 2013. of URA)) is a subzone of Jurong West, Singapore.

This subzone comprises businesses, educational institutions, residential developments and civic and community institutions.

== History ==
Bulim

Name transcription(s)
  - Chinese: 武林
  - Pinyin: Wǔlín
  - Hokkien POJ: Bú-lîm
- Country: Singapore

Prior to the 1990s, the subzone was part of the Bulim estate (a Slum) and where the Bulim Hill Cemetery (a Chinese cemetery) was located. In 1984, the cemetery was closed and exhumed thereafter to make way for the Kranji and Pan Island expressways. This segregated the Bulim estate and its western section became a subzone of Jurong West and was given the name Wenya.

In the 1990s, the development of Wenya began. Originally designed to be a residential subzone, the first two housing estates were completed in 2000 and 2002 respectively, complemented with the re-location of Corporation Primary (Note: "The History". of Corporation Primary School) and Westwood Secondary schools to the area in 2001, and the building of associated facilities for living. In 2005, the Housing and Development Board released two land parcels in the subzone for interim uses.

In 2007, the subzone was however re-zoned to be an Industrial area and the eastern section (occupying majority of the subzone) carved out and re-designed as Wenya Industrial Park. In 2012, a study was conducted to assess a new road network at the subzone for the industrial development. This led to the construction of Wenya Avenue and Wenya Street in 2013.

In 2014, the names of Wenya Avenue and Wenya Street (Note: "URA Masterplan 2013". that shows the original names of the roads concerned) were changed to Bulim Avenue and Bulim Street respectively.

== Economy ==
=== Bulim Industrial Park ===
Situated east of the existing residential developments in the subzone, this is an Industrial zone that has been steadily developing since 2012 (Note: "Draft Master Plan 2013". that showing boundary of the Bulim Industrial Park). It will be part of the 2 West Integrated industrial township, which includes the neighboring NTU, CleanTech Park and a section of Tengah.

With the completion of a data centre and a corporate headquarters in the zone, the first section of the Industrial Park is set to open in 2014, followed by the opening of the second section in 2015, when a new bus depot, to be operated by Tower Transit Singapore, is ready (Note: "New bus depot to support bus fleet expansion under BSEP". Archived from the original on 11 January 2014., Press Release of Wenya Bus Depot.).

==== Interim uses ====
Along Jurong West Street 25, there are 2 interim developments, namely a Nursery(Thong Hup Gardens) and a Sports Ground for Futsal(Golazo Futsal Singapore).

=== Commercial ===
At the ground floor of Block 276 (a multi-storey car park), there is an Eating House, Clinic, Salon, Betting kiosk, Food & Beverages-cum-Launderette shop, and 3 Provision Shops, as well as an automated teller machine (ATM) (Note: "Search Result". for HDB Commercial Properties).

=== Industrial ===
Along Bulim Avenue and Bulim Street, developments for a Logistics Park has been ongoing since 2013. Currently, there are 3 businesses that are currently operating at Bulim, namely Google, Kintetsu World Express (KWE) and recently LF Logistics. Constructions for two more industrial buildings are currently ongoing along Bulim Avenue. This location for a Logistics Park makes strategic sense, as it is near the Pan-Island Expressway (PIE), Kranji-Expressway (KJE), access to labour market with flats nearby, and connections to Boon Lay Bus Interchange via feeder bus service along Jurong West Street 25 and 23.

== Transport ==
Wenya is linked to the PIE Expressway with Major Arterial Roads Jurong West Avenue 2 (from Changi) and Jalan Bahar (from Tuas and KJE Expressway), and to the AYE with Jalan Bahar (via Jalan Boon Lay). From the Major Arterial Roads, Minor Arterial Roads Jurong West Avenue 3, Bulim Avenue and Bulim Drive distribute the traffic to the various Primary Access Roads in the subzone.

- The roads in Wenya Industrial Park, Bulim Avenue and Bulim Drive, are not now open to traffic.

=== Bus ===
There are 3 bus routes plying in the subzone:

- 181 – connects residents of Bulim to Gek Poh and Jurong Point, while linking them to the Boon Lay Bus Interchange and MRT station.
- 185 – links the subzone to the rest of Jurong West (excluding Boon Lay, Chin Bee and Taman Jurong), and also to selected sections of Jurong East, Clementi and Queenstown, plying to and fro Soon Lee Bus Depot and Buona Vista Terminal. (Note: New Service 185.)
- 651 – operates only during morning and evening peak periods, and charges a flat fare comparable to the MRT, connects the subzone directly to the Downtown Core, via the AYE (Note: "New services" (PDF). from Jurong West to CBD).

Along the boundary of the subzone,

there are 4 bus routes plying along Jalan Bahar:
- 172 – connects the subzone to Boon Lay Bus Interchange and MRT station (via Boon Lay Way and Jurong West Street 64), and Choa Chu Kang (via Old Choa Chu Kang Road).
- 199 – connects the subzone to Boon Lay Bus Interchange and MRT station (via Jurong West Central 1), and the Teacher Training Institute (via Nanyang Avenue).
- 405 – operates only during Religious Festivals, connects the subzone to Choa Chu Kang Cemetery, while duplicating route 199 when plying to Boon Lay Bus Interchange and MRT station.
- 974 - connects the subzone to Bukit Panjang, Choa Chu Kang, and Joo Koon Bus Interchange, while connecting it to the Pioneer MRT station and Boon Lay MRT station (via Jalan Boon Lay, Boon Lay Way, Jurong West Street 64 and Jurong West Street 63).
there is 1 bus route plying along Jurong West Avenue 2:
- 157 – connects the subzone to Hong Kah, Bukit Batok, Bukit Timah, the northern border of Novena, and Toa Payoh, while connecting it to the Boon Lay Bus Interchange and MRT station (via Boon Lay Way and Jurong West Central 2).

== Education ==
There are four educational institutions in this subzone.

- There is a Child Care centre at blk 274D operated by PCF Hong Kah North.
- There is a Kindergarten at blk 276D operated by Agape Child Care(Jw) Pte. Ltd.
- Corporation Primary School is located at Jurong West Street 24.
- Westwood Secondary School is located at Jurong West Street 25.

== Housing ==
There are 24 housing blocks in this subzone and all are public apartments.

=== Public apartments ===
Street	Estate name	Blocks	Quantity	Note
24		271A-271D, 272A-272D	8	
25	Wenya	273A-273D, 274A-274D, 275A-275D, 276A-276D	16	

The public apartments and associated infrastructure are managed and maintained by West Coast Town Council.

=== Politics ===
Bulim is part of West Coast GRC after the 2020 general election and its member of parliament is Ms Foo Mee Har who is the MP for Ayer Rajah-Gek Poh division.

== Community spaces ==
=== Health and medical care ===
The Saint Joseph's Home at Jurong Road provides "shelter, care and love for the aged and the destitute."

=== Civic and community institutions ===
The Singapore Boys' Home and the Singapore Boys' Hostel at Jurong West Street 24 are for male juveniles arrested and charged by the law.

== Recreation ==
Jalan Bahar Park, at the junction of Avenue 3 and Street 24, is a major park maintained by Chua Chu Kang Town Council.
