= Jurong Central Park =

Park in Singapore

Coordinates: 1.33810°N 103.70778°E

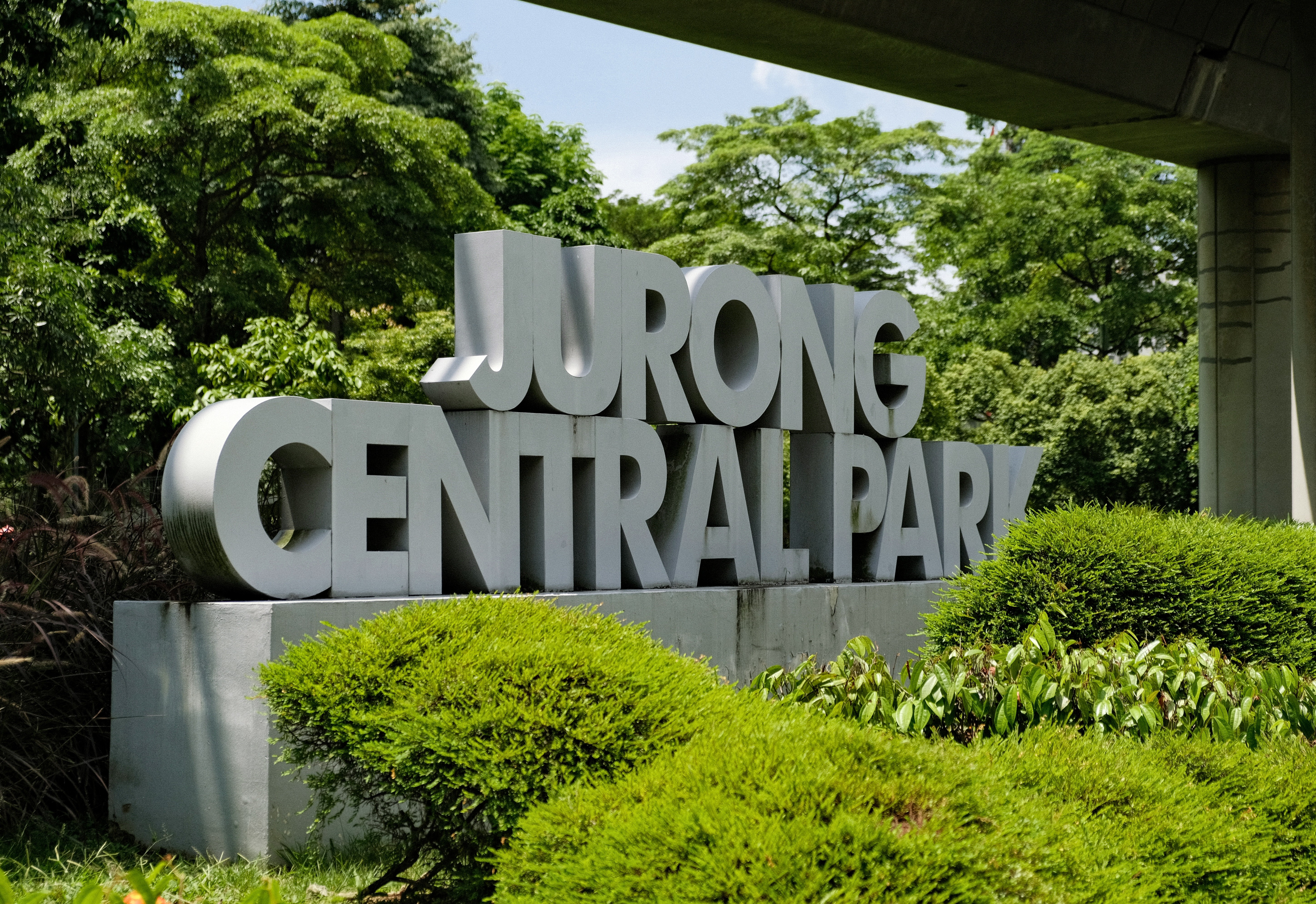
- Entrance signboard
- Interactive map of Jurong Central Park
- Type: Urban park
- Location: Jurong West, Singapore
- Area: 8 hectares (80,000 m^{2})
- Public transit: EW27 Boon Lay

Jurong Central Park is a regional park located in Jurong West, Singapore.

== Activities ==
Other activities such as participating in concerts and performances, family gatherings, inline skating is available.

== Getting there ==
The park can be reached by public transport from Boon Lay MRT station. Visitors can reach the park by crossing a pedestrian overhead bridge along Boon Lay Way from the MRT station, Jurong Point or Boon Lay Bus Interchange.

== See also ==
- List of parks in Singapore
