= Jurong West =

Residential town in the West Region of Singapore

- Planning Area and HDB Town

Other transcription(s)
  - Chinese: 裕廊西; Yùlángxī (Pinyin); Jū-lâng-sai (Hokkien POJ)
  - Malay: Jurong Barat (Rumi) جوروڠ بارت (Jawi)
  - Tamil: ஜூரோங் மேற்கு Jūrōṅ Mēṟku (Transliteration)
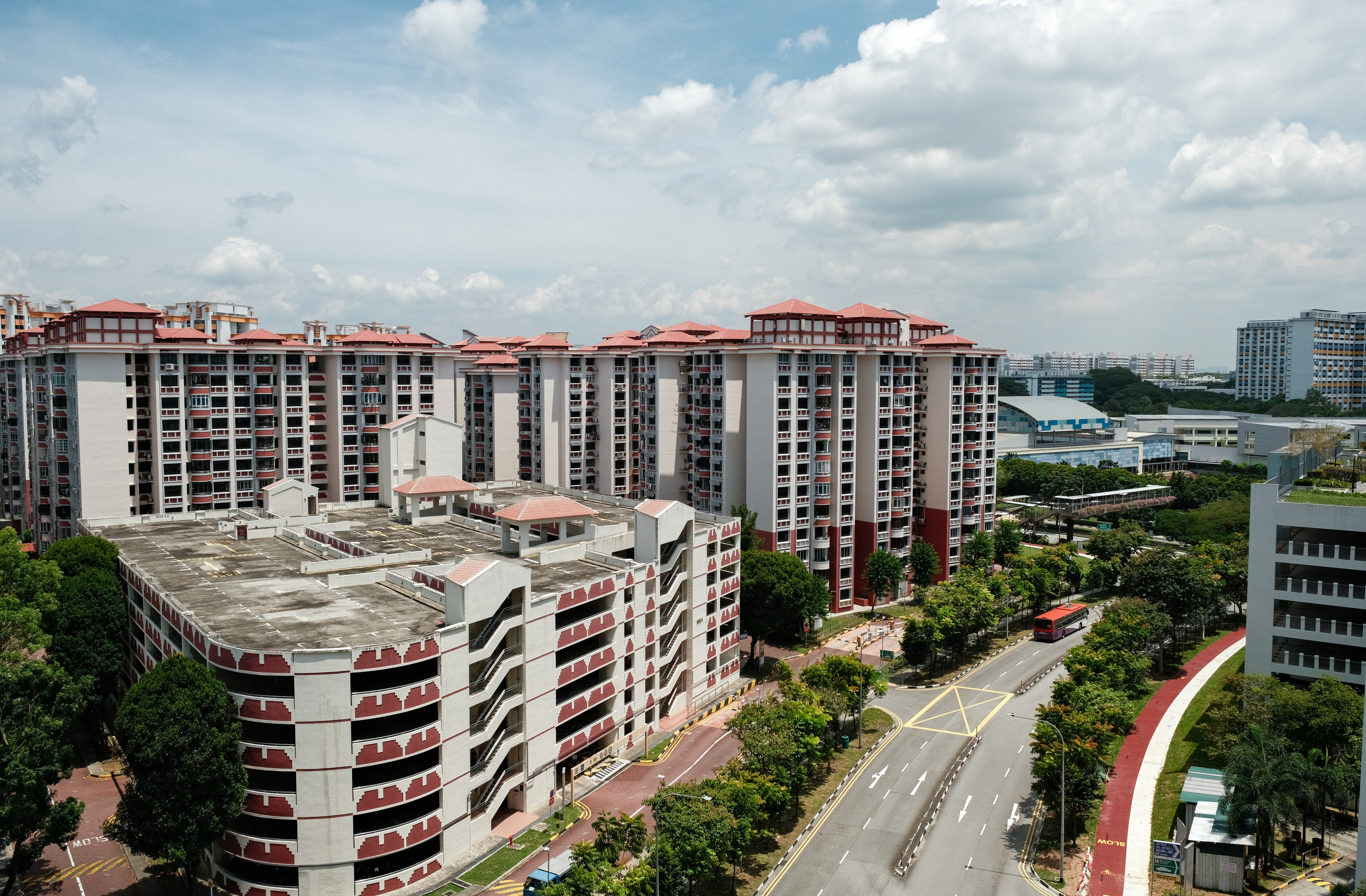
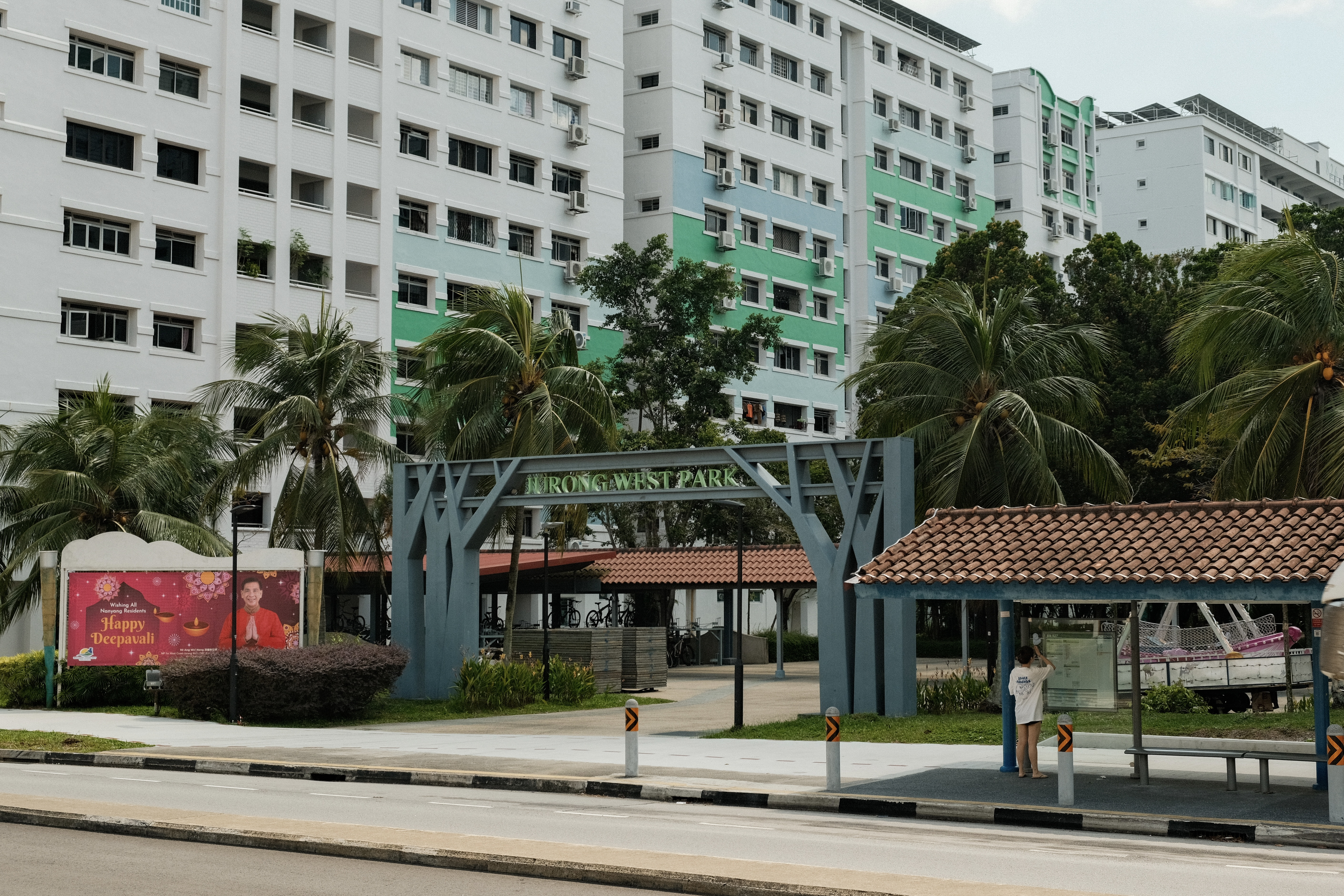
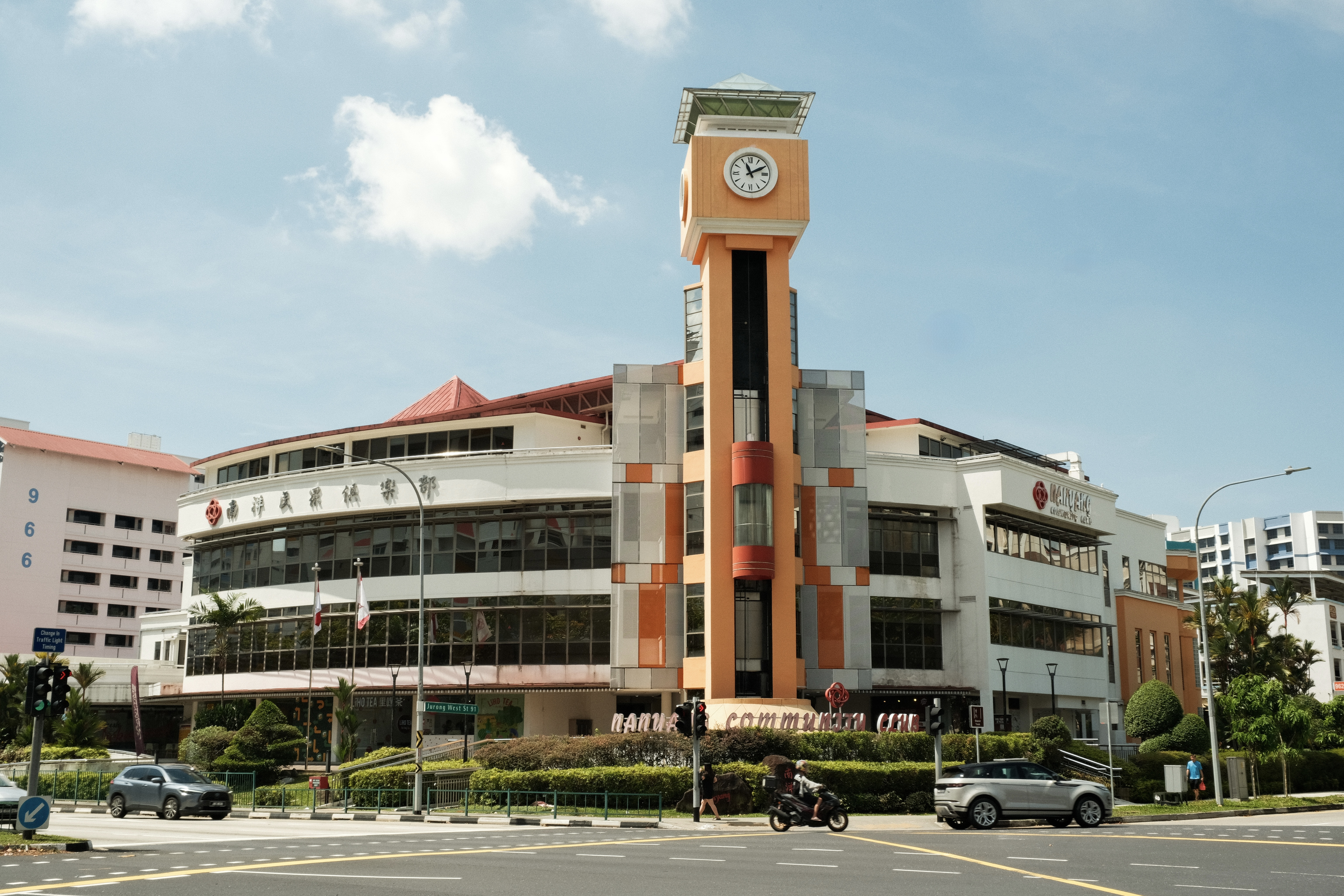
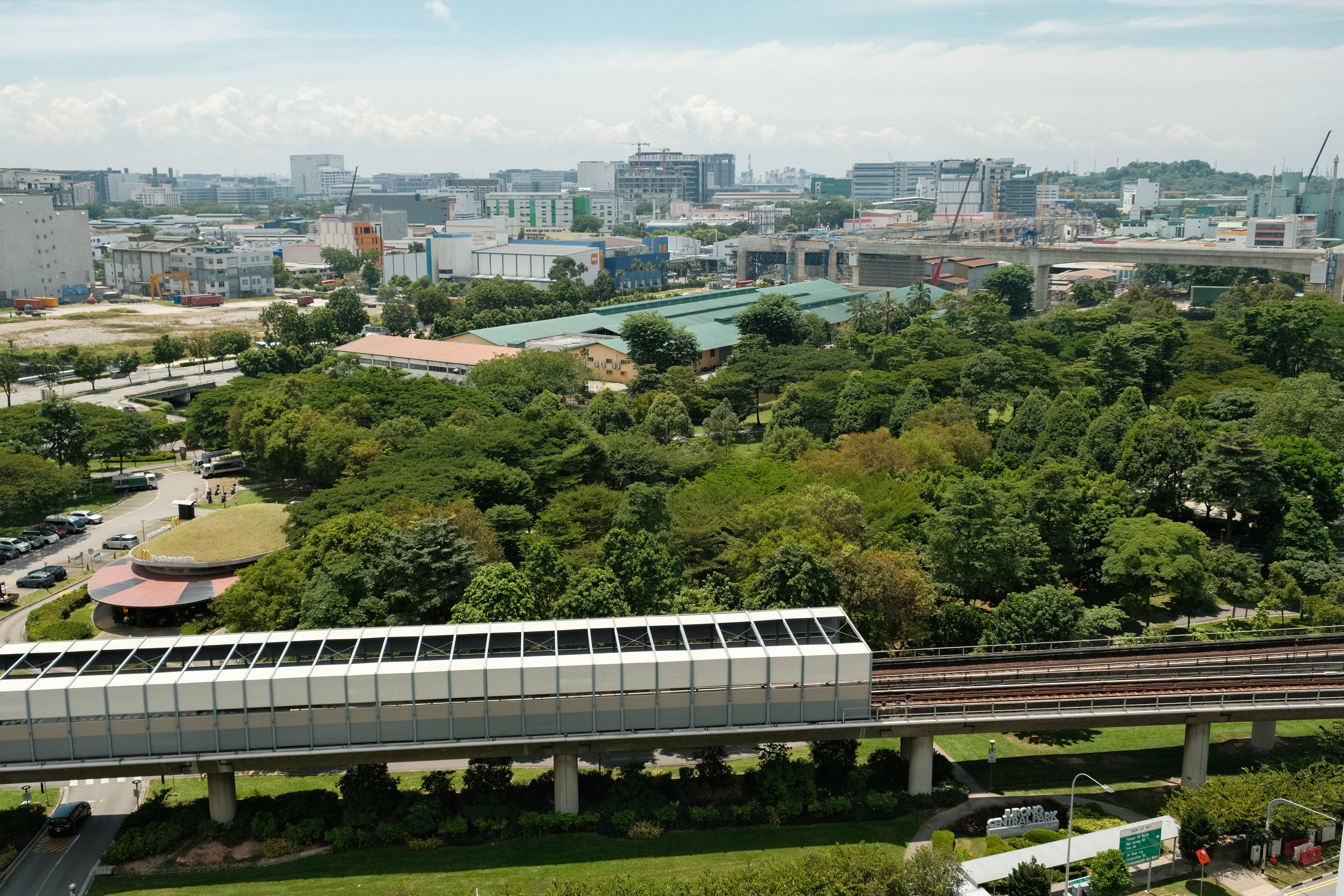
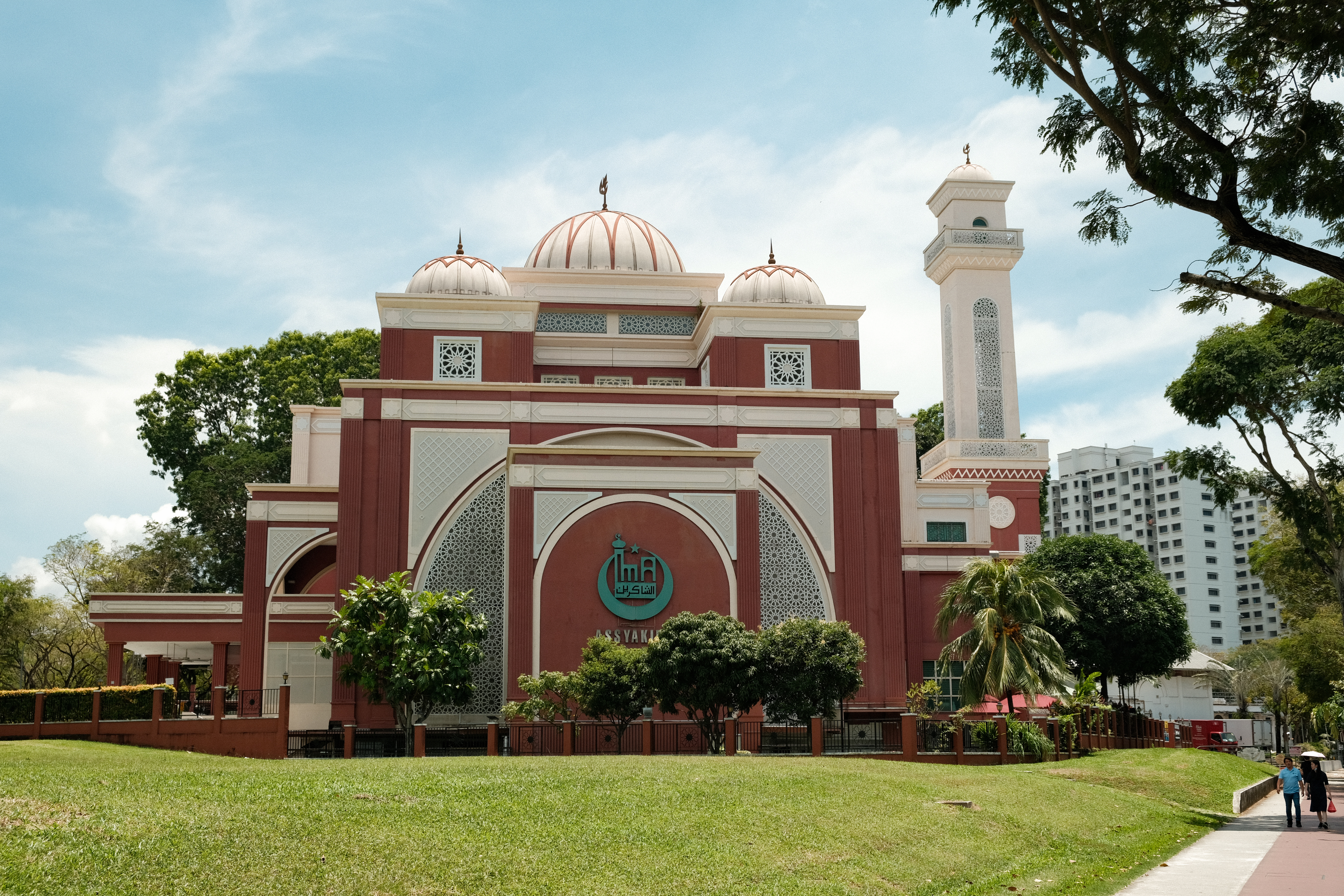
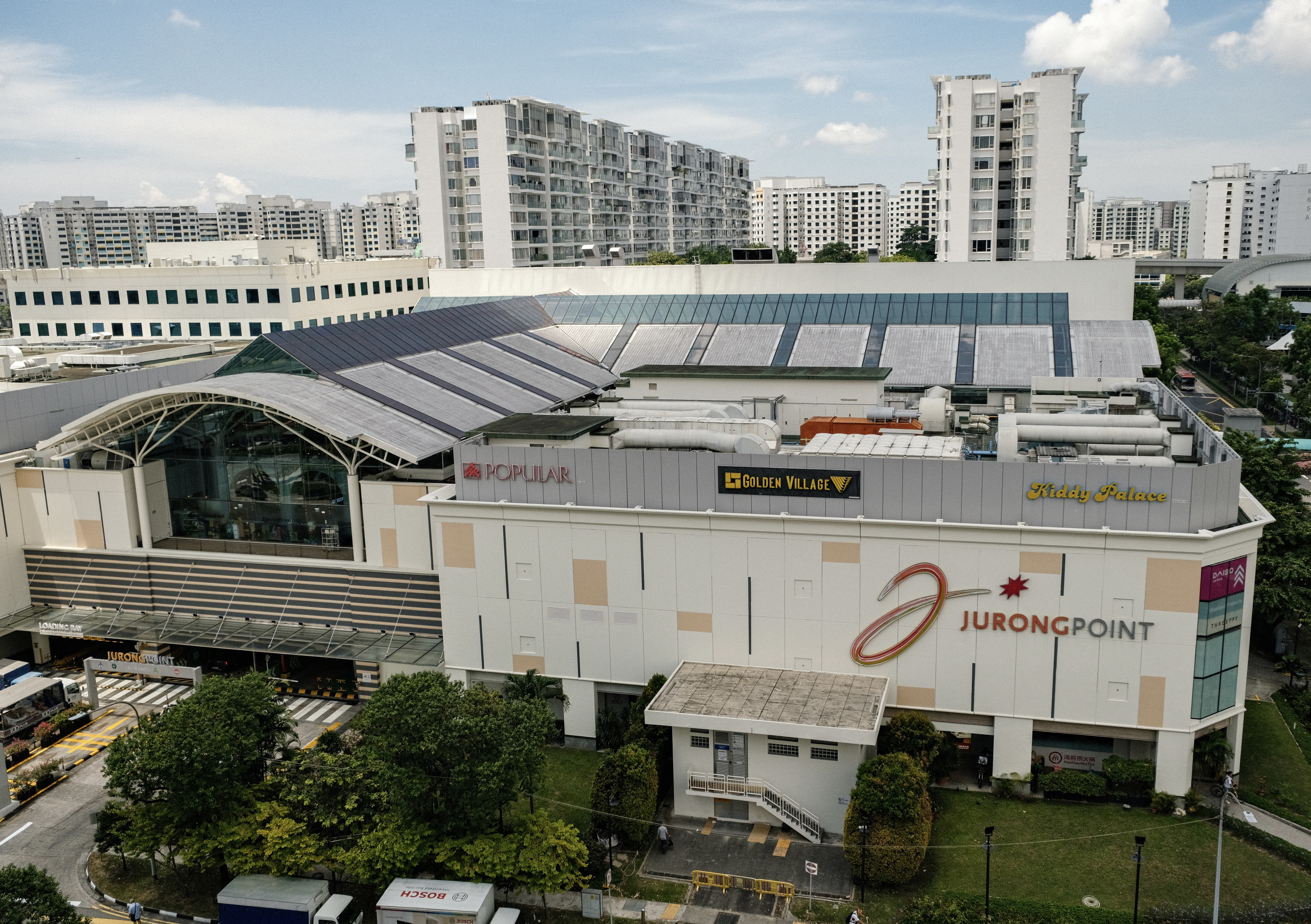
- From top, left to right: HDB flats in Jurong West Central, HDB flats in Nanyang, Nanyang Community Centre, Jurong Central Park, Assyakirin Mosque, Jurong Point

- Location of Jurong West in Singapore

- Location of Jurong West within Singapore
- Coordinates: 1°20′23″N 103°42′16″E
- Country: Singapore
- Region: West Region
- CDCs: South West
- Town Councils: Jurong–Clementi–Bukit Batok; West Coast–Jurong West
- Constituencies: Jurong Central SMC; Pioneer SMC; West Coast–Jurong West GRC

Government
  - Mayors: South West CDC: Low Yen Ling
  - Members of Parliament: Jurong Central SMC: Xie Yao Quan; Pioneer SMC: Patrick Tay; West Coast–Jurong West GRC: Desmond Lee; Ang Wei Neng; Cassandra Lee; Shawn Huang Wei Zhong; Hamid Razak

Area
  - Total: 14.68 km^{2} (5.67 sq mi)
  - Residential: 4.8 km^{2} (1.9 sq mi)

Population (2026)
  - Total: 250,890
  - Density: 17,090/km^{2} (44,260/sq mi)

Ethnic groups (2020)
  - Chinese: 183,590
  - Malays: 46,520
  - Indians: 26,360
  - Others: 6,260
- Postal district: 22 (Sectors 60–64)
- Dwelling units: 73,510
- Projected ultimate: 94,000

Jurong West (IPA: /ˈdʒʊrɒŋwɛst/ JOO-rong WEST) is a planning area and new town in the West Region of Singapore. It is bordered by Tengah to the north, Boon Lay and Pioneer to the south, Jurong East to the east, and Western Water Catchment to the west.

Jurong West was developed as a residential satellite town to support the nearby Jurong Industrial Estate. Large-scale public housing development by the Housing and Development Board (HDB) began in the late 1970s, with residential estates concentrated in areas such as Boon Lay, Hong Kah, Jurong West Central, Taman Jurong and Yunnan.

Jurong West is one of the largest and most populous towns in western Singapore, with a resident population of over 250,000. It is served by major transport links, healthcare facilities, schools, tertiary institutions and sports amenities.

== Etymology ==
The place name Jurong is socio-linguistically traced to the Malay word jerung, denoting a shark, which historically alluded to the marine fauna populating the mangrove-lined estuaries of Sungei Jurong. Prior to state-led land requisition and industrial transformation in the mid-20th century, the region comprised undulating rural topography dominated by gambier and rubber plantations, fruit orchards, brackish swamps, and traditional coastal settlements (kampongs). Following the administrative spatial division of western Singapore, the urbanizing residential zone situated west of the riverine corridor was officially designated as Jurong West.

== Town development ==
=== Industrial Roots and JTC Administration (1960s–1970s) ===
Following Singapore's attainment of self-governance, economic strategy under the direction of Dr Goh Keng Swee prioritized export-oriented industrialization. The Jurong region was selected as the national locus for heavy manufacturing and industrial expansion, leading to the creation of the Jurong Industrial Estate under the administration of the Jurong Town Corporation (JTC). To accommodate the influx of industrial workers and engineers, JTC initiated low-cost residential construction in the late 1960s, establishing the foundational public housing precincts around Taman Jurong.

=== HDB Integration and Accelerated Expansion (1979–1990s) ===
In 1979, executive jurisdiction over public housing in Jurong was formally transferred from JTC to the Housing & Development Board (HDB) to align architectural standards and municipal governance across the nation.

Throughout the 1980s and 1990s, HDB spearheaded aggressive urban expansion across the town. Planning schemes incorporated multi-storey high-density block configurations, neighborhood retail centers, wet markets, integrated hawker centers, and educational campuses. Subzones such as Hong Kah, Boon Lay, Yunnan, and Pioneer were progressively urbanized, transforming Jurong West into a fully autonomous suburban township.

=== Contemporary Urban Renewal ===
In the 21st century, Jurong West has undergone substantial qualitative urban renewal. Through schemes such as the Home Improvement Programme (HIP) and the active expansion of Transit-Oriented Developments (TODs), the town has consolidated its position as a vibrant socio-economic node. Future economic expansion is closely tied to the multi-phase deployment of the Jurong Innovation District (JID) in the northern subzone of Wenya.

== Geography ==
Jurong West is bounded by major transport infrastructure and geographic features:

- North: Delineated by the Pan Island Expressway (PIE), forming an administrative border with the emerging eco-town of Tengah.
- East: Constrained by the riverine network of Sungei Jurong and the recreational expanse of Jurong Lake.
- South: Bordered by the Ayer Rajah Expressway (AYE) and the heavy manufacturing precincts of the Jurong Industrial Estate.
- West: Terminated by Benoi Road, Upper Jurong Road, and training grounds allocated to the Singapore Armed Forces.

=== Subzones ===
According to the Urban Redevelopment Authority (URA) Master Plan, Jurong West is partitioned into nine distinct planning subzones:

- Boon Lay: The high-density commercial and transit nexus of the planning area.
- Chin Bee: A non-residential industrial estate dedicated to food manufacturing and light engineering.
- Hong Kah: An established residential precinct containing comprehensive community infrastructure.
- Jurong West Central: The core commercial precinct characterized by high-rise public residential developments and public institutions.
- Kian Teck: An industrial subzone positioned south of Jurong Central Park.
- Safti: A military subzone accommodating the SAFTI Military Institute and defense education institutions.
- Taman Jurong: The historical locus of urban development in western Jurong, abutting Jurong Lake.
- Wenya: An evolving mixed-use precinct incorporated into the master plan for the Jurong Innovation District.
- Yunnan: A residential subzone situated adjacent to Nanyang Technological University (NTU), comprising public housing and private landed enclaves.

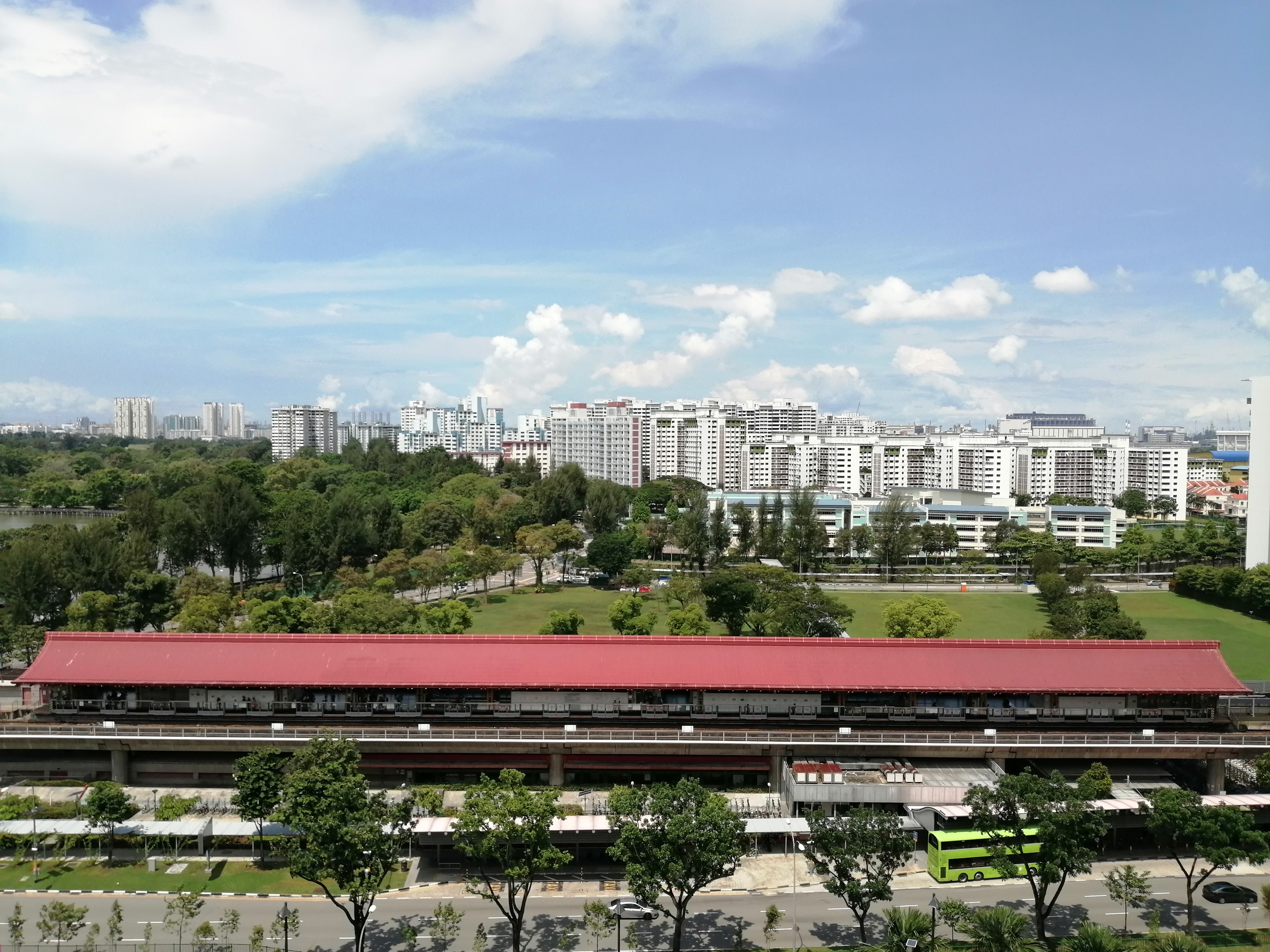
Taman Jurong sub-zone, with Lakeside MRT station in the background.

== Demographics ==
According to official demographic registers released by the Department of Statistics, Jurong West maintained a resident population of 250,890. The subzone of Yunnan represents the most populous area (64,680 residents), followed by Jurong West Central (60,100 residents), whereas Chin Bee, Kian Teck, and Safti contain no permanent residential population.

=== Population history ===
| Year | Resident Population | Annual Growth Rate (%) | Ref. |
|---|---|---|---|
| 2000 | 204,750 | — | |
| 2005 | 233,750 | +2.68% | |
| 2010 | 267,520 | +2.74% | |
| 2015 | 272,660 | +0.38% | |
| 2020 | 262,730 | −0.74% | |
| 2025 | 253,840 | −0.69% | |
| 2026 | 250,890 | −1.16% | |

=== Age Profile and Ageing Dynamics ===
Demographic structure displays a maturing population profile. As of 2026, working-age residents (aged 15–64 years) constituted 69.5% of the populace (174,360 individuals), while senior citizens (aged 65 years and over) comprised 18.4% (46,140 individuals). Cohorts under 15 years represented 12.6% (30,400 individuals). The demographic peak occurs within the 50–54 age bracket, reflecting broader national trends of demographic maturation.

The population pyramid of Jurong West.

=== Housing Tenure and Density ===
Jurong West exhibits an exceptionally high reliance on public housing. Approximately 91.0% of the town's population (228,300 residents) resides in HDB properties, significantly exceeding the national average of 75.5% and ranking second nationwide behind Woodlands. Within the public tenure spectrum, 5-room and Executive apartments constitute the single largest housing typology, accommodating 38.4% of the populace (96,250 residents). Private condominiums and landed estates account for 6.9% and 1.6% of housing choices, respectively.

The homeownership rate within the town stands at 94.9%, outstripping the national figure of 91.2%. The average household size is recorded at 3.23 persons.

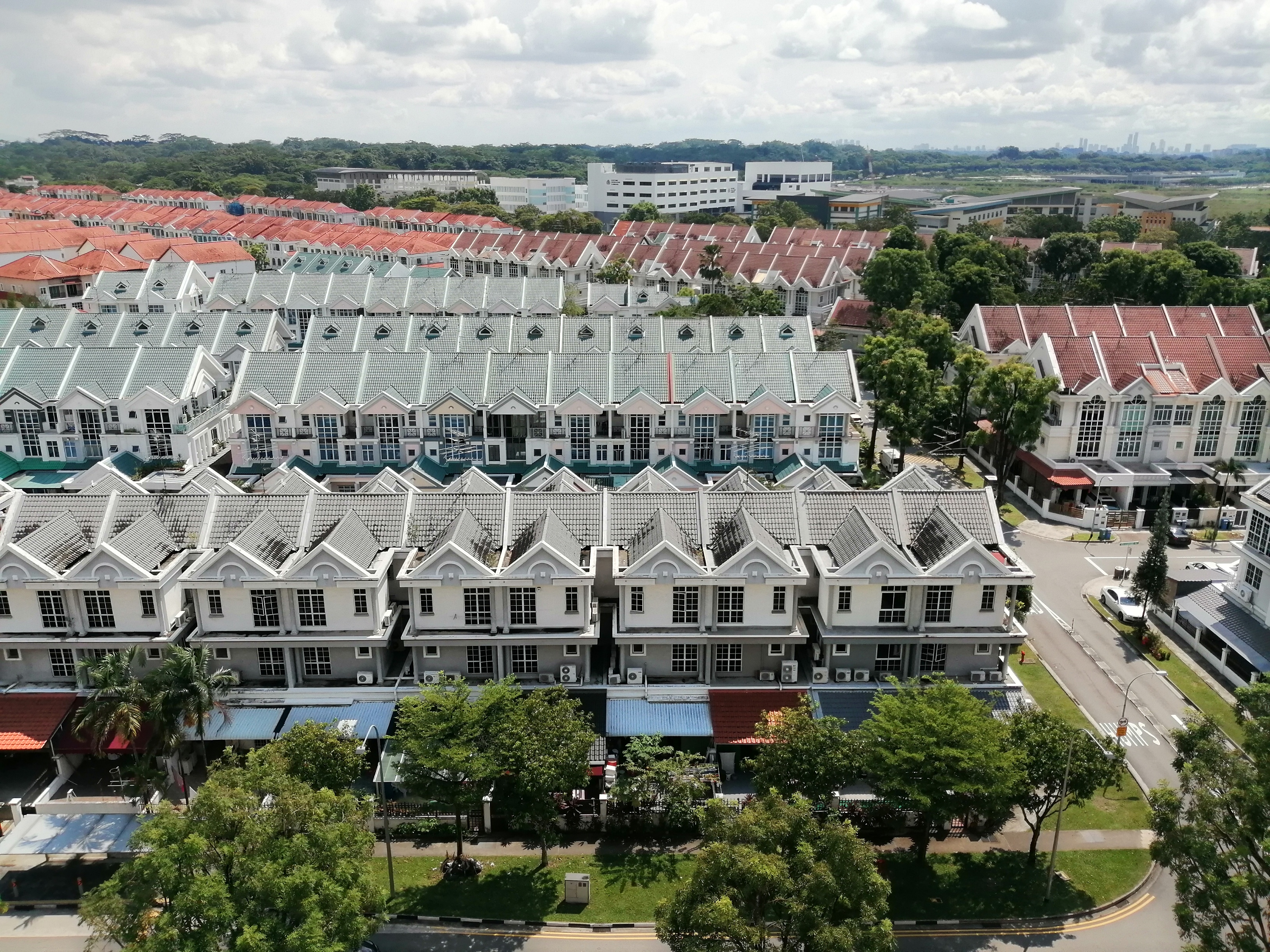
The Westwood Landed Housing Estate, located along Jurong West Avenue 5.

=== Ethnic Composition ===
The resident population displays higher ethnic diversity relative to national benchmarks. Census figures indicate the following breakdown:

- Chinese: 68.5%
- Malay: 18.4%
- Indian: 10.5%
- Others: 2.6%

=== Religious Affiliation ===
The religious profile of Jurong West is heterogeneous: Buddhism constitutes the largest religious group (33.55%), followed by individuals declaring no religious affiliation (22.31%), Islam (18.55%), Taoism (9.60%), Christianity (8.99%), Hinduism (6.40%), and Sikhism (0.52%). Remarkably, Jurong West registers the lowest proportion of practicing Christians among all planning areas in Singapore, and is the sole planning area where Taoist adherents outnumber Christian adherents.

=== Educational Attainment and Literacy ===
The literacy rate among residents aged 15 and above is 98.4%. Dual-language literacy is prevalent, with 71.6% proficient in at least two official languages (predominantly English and Mandarin Chinese). In terms of tertiary qualifications, 27.5% of residents hold university degrees, below the national average of 36.7%.

=== Linguistic Profile ===
English is reported as the primary household language by 42.1% of residents—the lowest percentage across all planning areas in Singapore compared to the national baseline of 58.1%. Mandarin Chinese is spoken most frequently at home by 36.0%, Malay by 10.4%, non-Mandarin Chinese dialects by 5.4%, and Tamil by 4.18%.

=== Socio-Economic and Labour Metrics ===
The labor force participation rate stands at 96.2%, with 152,800 residents in active employment. The median individual employment income displays a concentration in middle-tier salary bands, with median household incomes reflecting the town's predominantly working-to-middle-class industrial employment base.

== Notable Places and Community Landmarks ==
- Jurong Central Park: A 15-hectare urban park integrating stormwater management features, naturalized ecological corridors, and life-sized recreational board game installations.
- SAFTI Military Institute: An 88-hectare tri-service officer cadet training institute situated along Upper Jurong Road.
- Singapore Discovery Centre: An interactive educational museum and defense showcase institution designed to foster civic consciousness and national defense awareness.

== Transport ==
Jurong West is served by an integrated transport network comprising mass rapid transit (MRT) lines, public bus services, arterial roads, and active-mobility infrastructure.

=== Bus ===
Public bus transport within Jurong West is split between the Jurong West Bus Package and the Bulim Bus Package. Operations are largely dominated by SMRT Buses, which manages roughly three-quarters of local feeder and trunk services under the Jurong West package out of Soon Lee Bus Depot. Tower Transit operates the remaining quarter under the Bulim package out of Bulim Bus Depot, primarily serving eastern neighborhoods such as Hong Kah and Taman Jurong.

Additionally, SBS Transit operates several trunk and cross-town bus routes running through Jurong West, connecting the town to other regions across Singapore.

Transit operations converge at two primary transport hubs: Boon Lay Bus Interchange—which serves as a major regional interchange—and Joo Koon Bus Interchange.

In advance of the opening of the Jurong Region Line (JRL), the Land Transport Authority announced in September 2026 that interim JRL shuttle bus services would be introduced starting from the second half of 2027. These express shuttle services will broadly mirror the planned rail alignment with reduced stops, providing high-frequency transit links between key station locations during the construction phase.

=== Rail ===
Jurong West is currently served by the East–West Line (EWL) via four elevated rapid transit stations: Lakeside, Boon Lay, Pioneer, and Joo Koon. Lakeside serves the southeastern residential estates, Boon Lay functions as the principal multi-modal transport hub integrated with the bus interchange, Pioneer provides access to western residential precincts and university corridors, and Joo Koon serves the western industrial and commercial zones.

Boon Lay station originally opened on the East–West Line in July 1990 and served as the western terminus for nearly two decades until the opening of the Boon Lay MRT Extension to Pioneer and Joo Koon in February 2009.

Boon Lay MRT Station, before there was Jurong Region Line

To enhance intra-town connectivity and support major economic nodes such as the Jurong Innovation District and Nanyang Technological University (NTU), construction is underway on the elevated Jurong Region Line (JRL). Within the boundary of Jurong West, elevated JRL viaducts span key arterial thoroughfares including Jalan Boon Lay, Jurong West Avenue 2, Jurong West Street 64, and Jurong West Street 75.

In addition to expanding the existing Boon Lay MRT station into a major transfer interchange with the EWL, the Jurong Region Line introduces 5 additional stations within the Jurong West planning area: Corporation (JS5), Jurong West (JS6), Bahar Junction (JS7), Gek Poh (JW1), and Tawas (JW2).

The Jurong Region Line is scheduled to open in phases, with Stage 1 targeted for operational commencement in 2028. Upon full completion across its 25-station network, the line will feature key rail interchanges at Choa Chu Kang, Boon Lay, and Jurong East to distribute passenger traffic across western Singapore.

Long-term rail accessibility in the southern portion of the town will be further enhanced by the Cross Island Line Phase 3 (CRL3). Targeted to open in the late 2030s, CRL3 will introduce an underground station (CR20) along Jalan Terusan, situated directly south of the Taman Jurong subzone, connecting Jurong West directly to the Jurong Lake District, Clementi, and the eastern region of Singapore.

The execution of major rail infrastructure projects has also required spatial realignments within the town. For instance, the merger of Pioneer Primary School and Juying Primary School in 2022 allowed the former Pioneer Primary School site to be repurposed for construction staging and infrastructure works supporting the new rail alignment.

=== Cycling ===
Jurong West features an established network of dedicated pedestrian paths and cycling routes forming part of the Park Connector Network (PCN), facilitating non-motorized travel to rail stations, schools, and neighborhood parks.

In February 2025, a landmark 110-metre overhead cycling bridge spanning the Pan Island Expressway (PIE) was commissioned. It represents the first grade-separated active mobility crossing in Jurong West where cyclists can cross without dismounting, providing seamless access to the Round Island Route and the Jurong Innovation District.

=== Road ===
The town is linked into the regional expressway network via the Pan Island Expressway (PIE) along its northern periphery and the Ayer Rajah Expressway (AYE) along its southern boundary. Key arterial corridors providing direct connectivity between local precincts and these expressways include:

- Corporation Road
- Jalan Bahar
- Jalan Boon Lay
- Jurong West Avenue 2
- Jurong West Avenue 4
- Pioneer Road North
- Upper Jurong Road

Local road alignments across several of these primary corridors have been progressively reconfigured to integrate elevated viaduct structures and station foundations supporting the town's expanding rail network.

== Jurong West Town Centre ==
The Jurong West Town Centre is centered around Boon Lay MRT station, serving as the town's primary commercial, civic, and transit hub. The precinct integrates high-capacity transit infrastructure with extensive retail and community facilities.

=== Commercial and Civic Nodes ===
- Jurong Point: The town centre's primary commercial anchor and Singapore's largest suburban retail complex. Opened in December 1995, it underwent major expansions in 1999 and 2008 to provide over 750,000 square feet of retail gross floor area.
- Jurong West Community Building: An integrated multi-agency complex hosting key civic amenities, including the Jurong West Public Library, The Frontier Community Club, and the Jurong Medical Centre.

Jurong West Town Centre

=== Neighbourhood Centres ===
Several established neighbourhood centres serve the daily retail and dining needs of residents across Jurong West:

- Boon Lay Place Neighbourhood Centre
- Gek Poh Shopping Centre (temporarily closed for redevelopment until 2028)
- Hong Kah Point
- Jurong Ville Neighbourhood Centre
- Nanyang Neighbourhood Centre
- Pioneer Mall
- Taman Jurong Shopping Centre

Hong Kah Point

== Institutional Amenities ==
=== Educational Institutions ===
The planning area accommodates a rich network of basic and post-secondary educational infrastructure, complemented by junior college and university-level institutions.

- Primary and Secondary Education: Houses 10 primary schools and 10 secondary schools serving the residential precincts, including Westwood Primary School and Westwood Secondary School.

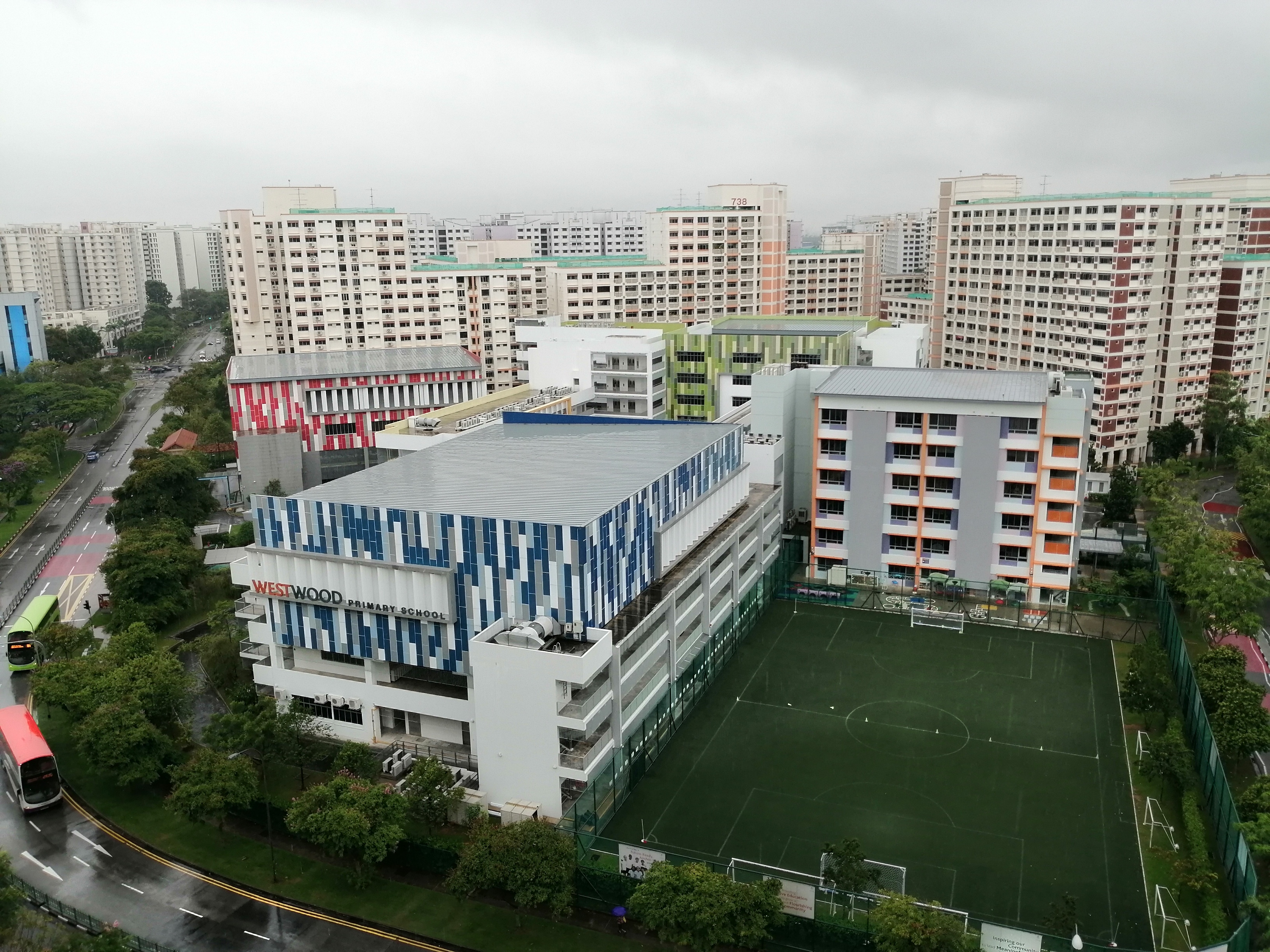
Westwood Primary School

- Pre-University Education: Jurong Pioneer Junior College, currently situated at Teck Whye, is scheduled to relocate back to a newly rebuilt campus at 800 Corporation Road in Jurong West in 2028.
- International Education: Hosts international campuses including the Canadian International School (Lakeside Campus).
- University Education: Abutting the northwestern boundary of the planning area is Nanyang Technological University (NTU), a world-ranked research university.

=== Emergency Services ===
Emergency fire and rescue services are anchored by Jurong Fire Station on Jalan Boon Lay. Spanning 4,000 square metres and operated by the Singapore Civil Defence Force (SCDF), it covers the dense residential neighborhoods as well as heavy industrial complexes in Jurong Industrial Estate.

Jurong Fire Station

=== Healthcare Facilities ===
Outpatient primary healthcare services in the public sector are led by Pioneer Polyclinic, which serves as a major primary care node for the township.

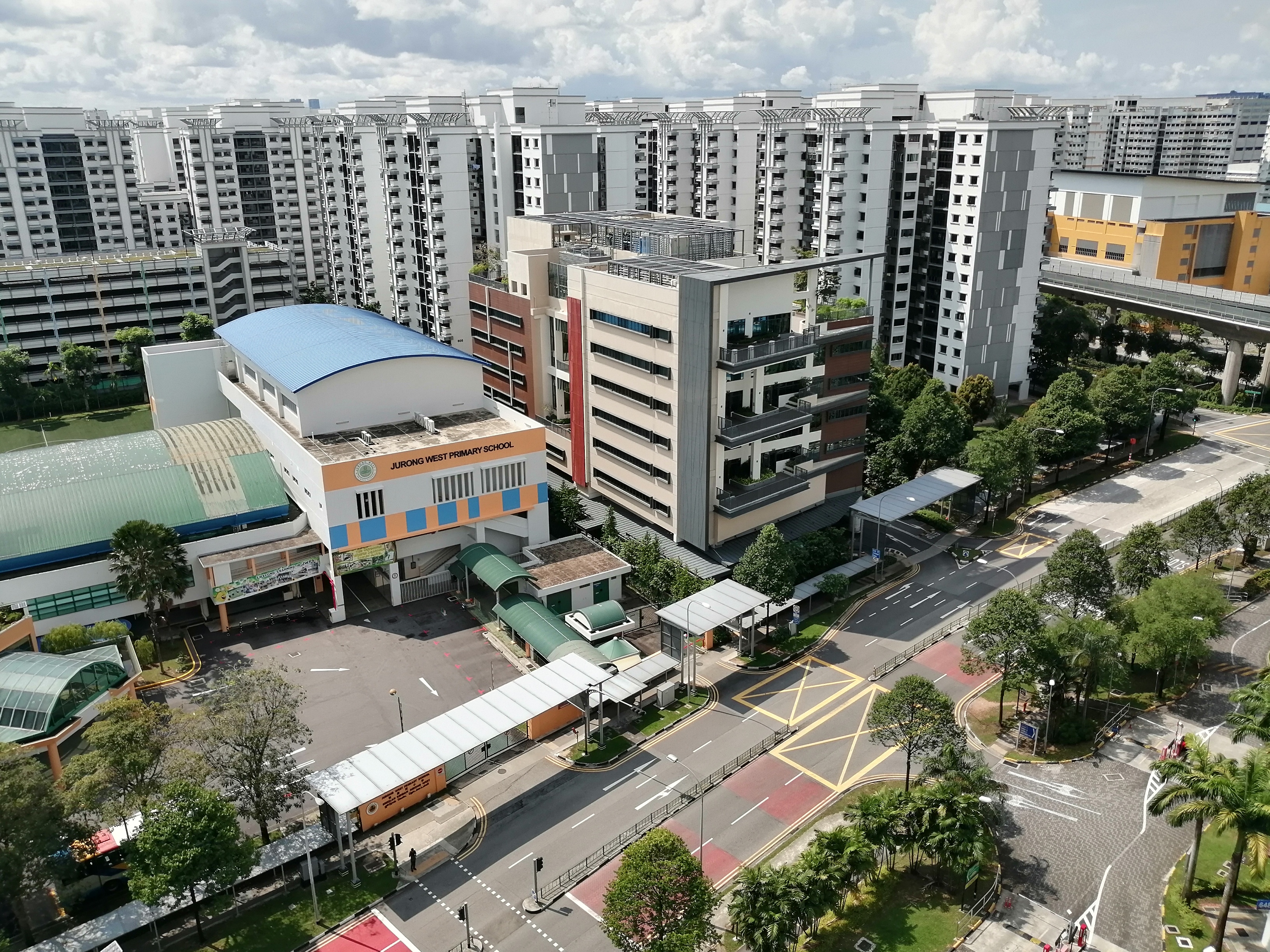
Pioneer Polyclinic

Complementing primary care services, Jurong Medical Centre functions as a one-stop day surgery and outpatient specialist centre integrated within the Jurong West Community Building.

These public assets are supported by a wide network of private general practitioner (GP) clinics distributed throughout neighbourhood centres and the Jurong West Town Centre.

Secondary and tertiary acute medical referral pathways connect Jurong West residents to Ng Teng Fong General Hospital and Jurong Community Hospital located in adjacent Jurong East.

=== Public Recreation ===
Public sports assets are concentrated at the Jurong West Sports Centre, managed by Sport Singapore. It remains the largest integrated sports complex in Singapore, featuring an outdoor stadium, sheltered competition pools, indoor sports halls, and fitness centers.

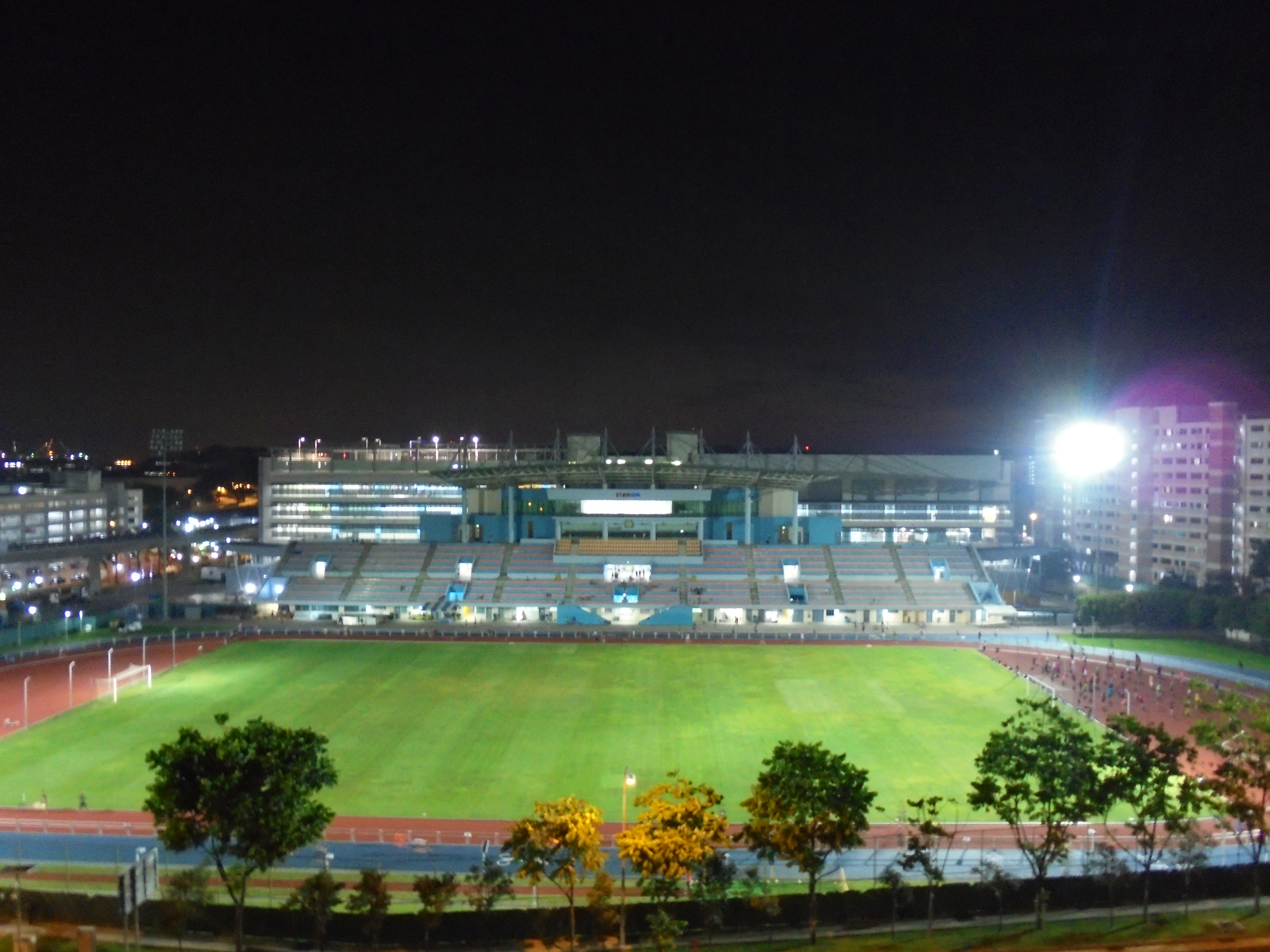
Jurong West Sports Centre

Community socialization is further supported by neighborhood community clubs including Taman Jurong CC, Nanyang CC, and Gek Poh Ville CC (currently closed for redevelopment until 2028).

== Political Evolution of Jurong West New Town ==
Before its urban redevelopment by the Housing & Development Board (HDB) in the late 1970s, Jurong West consisted mainly of rural plantations and coastal kampongs, represented as a single administrative unit under the historic Jurong Constituency.

As public housing expanded rapidly westward during the 1980s, rising population density led to the creation of single-member wards—such as Boon Lay SMC and Hong Kah SMC—to serve emerging subzones and residential precincts.

With the introduction of the Group Representation Constituency (GRC) system in 1988, political representation shifted to multi-member divisions to streamline municipal administration across western Singapore. Over subsequent decades, the town was divided among Hong Kah GRC (1989), West Coast GRC (1997), and Jurong GRC (2001), with high-density residential hubs periodically carved out as standalone single-member seats, such as Pioneer SMC in 2011.

Following recent electoral boundary revisions, political representation and municipal administration across the town are organized by region:

- Western Half: Represented by West Coast–Jurong West GRC and Pioneer SMC, with municipal services managed by the West Coast–Jurong West Town Council.
- Eastern Half: Represented by Jurong East–Bukit Batok GRC and Jurong Central SMC, with municipal services managed by the Jurong East–Bukit Batok Town Council.
