= Yunnan, Singapore =

Yunnan
- Subzone of Jurong West Planning Area & Housing Estate

Name transcription(s)
  - Chinese: 云南
  - Pinyin: Yúnnán
  - Hokkien POJ: Hûn-lâm
  - Malay: Yunnan
  - Tamil: யுன்னான்
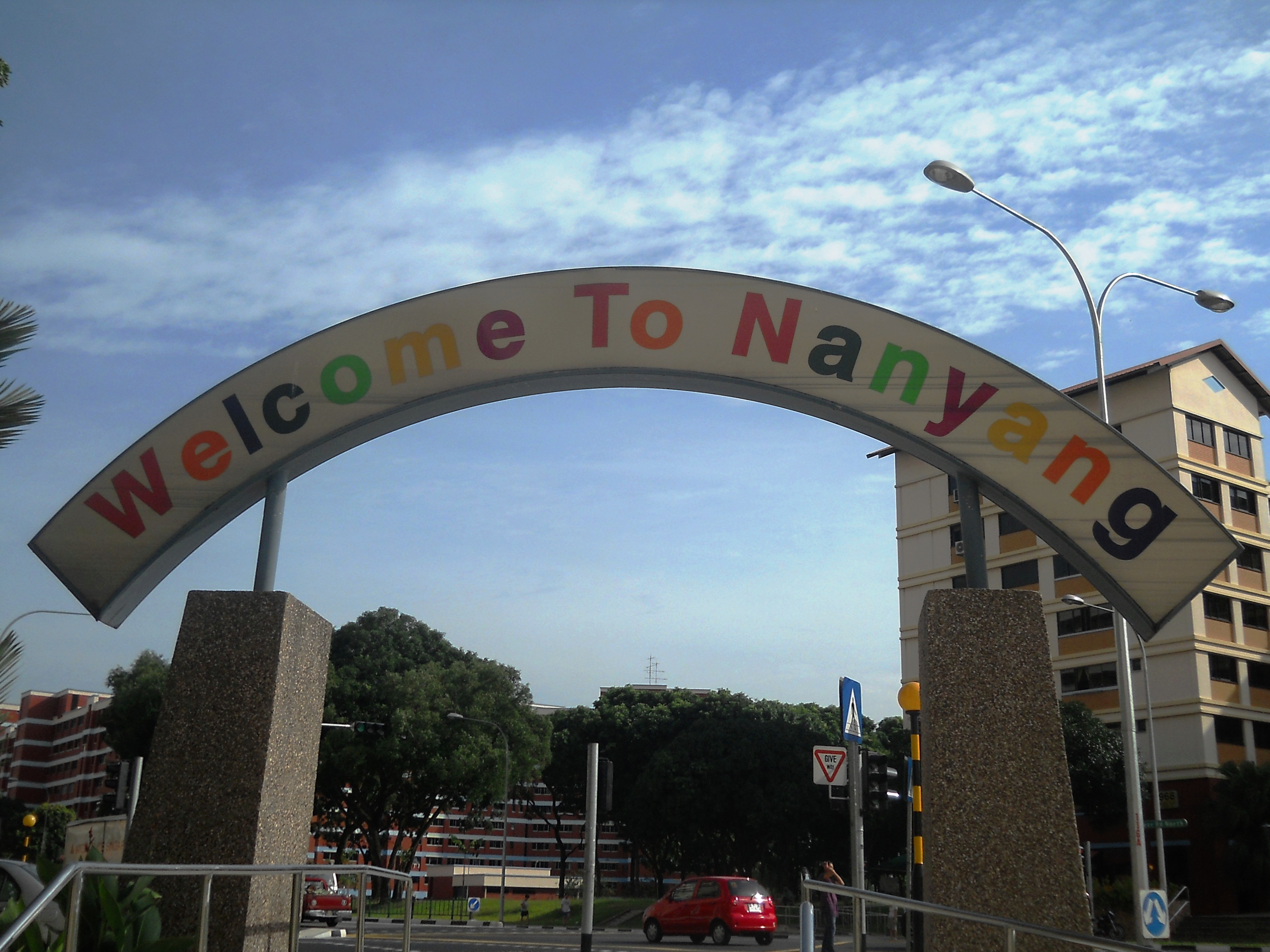
- "Welcome To Nanyang" arch
- Country: Singapore

Area
  - Total: 2.21 km^{2} (0.85 sq mi)

Population (2026)
  - Total: 64,680
  - Density: 29,300/km^{2} (75,800/sq mi)

Yunnan is a subzone located in the town of Jurong West in the West Region of Singapore.

== Politics ==
As of the 2025 election, Yunnan was under the constituents of the West Coast-Jurong West GRC (renamed from West Coast GRC prior to the 2020 election) and its neighbouring Pioneer SMC, which covers the south portions of Yunnan. The Yunnan divisions also consist of the eastern Gek Poh (also called Jurong Spring-Gek Poh) and the western Nanyang divisions, both previously part of the Chua Chu Kang GRC and the (now-defunct) Hong Kah North SMC until it was redrawn into West Coast GRC in 2020.

== Emergency Services ==
- The Jurong Police Division Headquarters is located at the junction of Jurong West Avenue 5 and Jalan Bahar. It also houses the Nanyang Neighbourhood Police Centre as well.
- The Jurong Fire Station is located at the junction along Jalan Bahar and Jurong West Avenue 2, providing fire and ambulance services to the region.

== Education ==
There are 5 education institutions in this subzone. Including Nanyang Technological University. Other educational institutions include:

- Juying Secondary School
- Xingnan Primary School
- West Grove Primary School
- Westwood Primary School

== Recreation ==
The Jurong West Sports and Recreation Centre is located at the south portion of the subzone, along Street 93 and Pioneer Road North whereas there are 2 parks in this subzone; Yunnan Park at Street 93 and Jurong West Park at Street 81.

== Community clubs ==
There are 2 community clubs in this subzone.

- Nanyang Community Club is at the junction of Street 91 and Pioneer Road North.
- Gek Poh Vile Community Club is at the junction of Street 75 and 74.

== Commercial areas ==
There are 2 commercial areas in this subzone, at Street 91 and at Gek Poh Shopping Centre (along Street 75) whereas both areas each feature a supermarket managed by Prime Group International.

== Places of worship ==
- Jin Fu Gong Temple (正华村金福宫) is at Jurong West Street 92.
- City Harvest Church is at the junction of Jurong West Street 91 and Pioneer Road North.
- Victory Family Centre is at Jurong West Street 74.

== Transportation ==
=== Road ===
There are 4 main roads in this subzone, Jalan Bahar, Jurong West Avenue 4/2, Pioneer Road North and Upper Jurong Road/Boon Lay Way. These main roads branch out to several minor roads (Streets and Avenues) in the subzone.

=== Public transport ===
Feeder services connect the subzone's neighborhoods to Boon Lay and Pioneer MRT stations, and several trunk services also run through the area.
