= Jurong West Central =

- Subzone of Jurong West Planning Area & Housing Estate

Name transcription(s)
  - Chinese: 裕廊西环
  - Pinyin: Yù láng xi huán
  - Malay: Jurong Barat Bahagian Tengah
  - Tamil: ஜூரோங் மேற்கு மத்திய
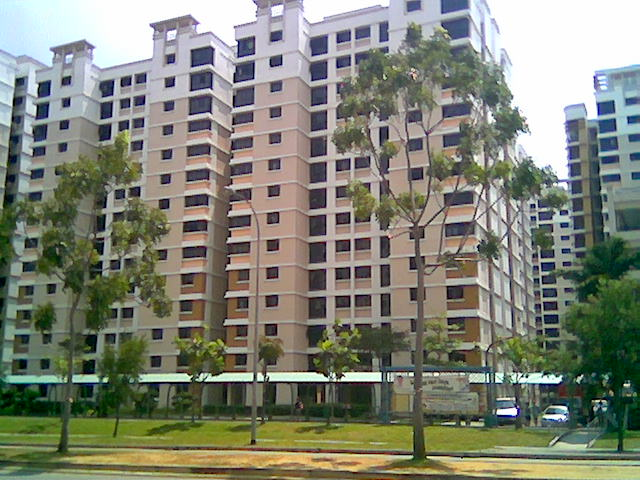
- A block of HDB flats along Street 61
- Interactive map of Jurong West Central
- Coordinates: 1.339°N 103.702°E
- Country: Singapore

Area
  - Total: 1.40 km^{2} (0.54 sq mi)

Population (2026)
  - Total: 60,100
  - Density: 42,900/km^{2} (111,000/sq mi)

Jurong West Central is a subzone of Jurong West, located in the West Region of Singapore. This is the town centre of Jurong West.

== Transport ==
=== Roads ===
There are 4 main roads in this subzone – Boon Lay Way, Jalan Boon Lay, Jurong West Avenue 4/2 and Pioneer Road North.

=== Rail ===
==== Mass Rapid Transit ====
The East West Line threads through the subzone along Street 63, with 2 stations (Boon Lay and Pioneer), situated at the Eastern and Western ends of the subzone. By 2027, there will be the Jurong Region Line, which would ply through the Eastern end of the subzone.

=== Bus ===
The Boon Lay Bus Interchange is situated here, along Central 3, within Jurong Point Shopping Centre and next to Boon Lay MRT Station.

== Healthcare ==
At the junction of Central 1 and Street 64, there is a government healthcare institution named Jurong Medical Centre.

A polyclinic, Pioneer Family Healthcare Centre near Pioneer MRT station along Street 61 started operations in November 2017 and opened in February 2018.

== Recreation ==
The Frontier Community Club is situated at the junction of Street 64 and Central 3, it is co-located with Jurong West Public Library. There are two parks – Jurong Central Park and Jurong West Neighbourhood Park. They can jog along the Jurong West Park Connector. In addition, there is Jurong West Public Library.

There is also SAFRA Clubhouse at Jurong, which is situated at the south-eastern fringe of the subzone, near to Boon Lay MRT Station. The Jurong West Sports and Recreation Centre is located at the western fringe of the subzone along Pioneer Road North.

== Commercial ==
There are 2 Shopping malls in this subzone, namely Jurong Point and Pioneer Mall. There are retail spaces at the concourse level of Pioneer and Boon Lay MRT stations, of which the one at Boon Lay is known as Boon Lay Xchange.

There is a market and hawker centre located adjacent to Pioneer Mall along Street 61 which opened in 2017.

== Education ==
There are 4 education institutions here, namely

- Jurong West Primary School
- Jurong West Secondary School
- Frontier Primary School
- Boon Lay Secondary School

At the fringes of the subzone, there are 2 education institutions, namely

- West Grove Primary School
- River Valley High School, Singapore

== Housing ==
There are a total of 188 housing blocks in this subzone, consisting of 176 (6 under construction) Public apartments and 12 blocks of Private Condominium. Most of the flats were built in 1999 – 2000, and earthworks had begun on 18 June 1995.

=== Public Apartments ===
==== HDB estates at N6 ====
| Street | Estate name | Blocks | Quantity | Note |
|---|---|---|---|---|
| 62/65 | | 601–613 | 13 | |
| 61/62/65 | | 617–637 | 21 | The neighbourhood shopping mall, Pioneer Mall (Block 638-638A) is located here. |
| 61 | | 639–647, 648A-648D, 649A-649B, 650A-650C | 18 | |
| 61 | | 651A-651B, 652A-652C, 653A-653C, 654A-654C, 655A-655B | 13 | |
| 61/65 | | 656A-656D, 657A-657B, 658A-658D | 10 | |
| 65/64 | | 659A-659D, 650A-650D, 661A-661D, 662A-662D | 16 | |
| 62/64 | | 663A-663D, 664A-664D, 665A-665B, 666A-666B | 12 | |
| 65/64 | | 667A-667D, 668A-668D, 669A-669B | 12 | |
| 65 | | 670A, 671A-671C, 672A, 673A-673C, 674A-674B | 10 | |
| 64 | Edelweiss@Jurong | 675A-675B, 676A-676B, 677A-677C, 678A-678D | 11 | |
| 64/Central 1 | | 679A-679C, 680A-680C, 681A-681C, 682A-682C, 683A-683C, 684A-684C, 685A-685C, 686A-686C | 24 | |
| Central 1/3 | Jurong Point Estate | 687–696 | 10 | |
| Central 2/3 | Jurong West Blossom | 697A-697C, 698A-698C | 6 | Completed in late 2016 |

The Public Apartments and the associated infrastructure are managed and maintained by West Coast Town Council.

=== Private Housing ===
| Street | Estate name | Block | Quantity | Note |
|---|---|---|---|---|
| Central 3 | The Centris | 65/7/9, 71/3/5/7/9, 81/3/5/7 | 12 | Integrated with Jurong Point and Boon Lay Bus Interchange |

== Politics ==
The Jurong West Central are managed by two different constituencies, both under the jurisdiction of the West Coast-Jurong West Town Council. The northern part of the Jurong West Central falls under the Boon Lay division of the West Coast-Jurong West GRC (overseen by minister Desmond Lee), while the southern part falls under the Pioneer SMC (overseen by MP Patrick Tay).
