= Jurong West Public Library =

Public library in Singapore

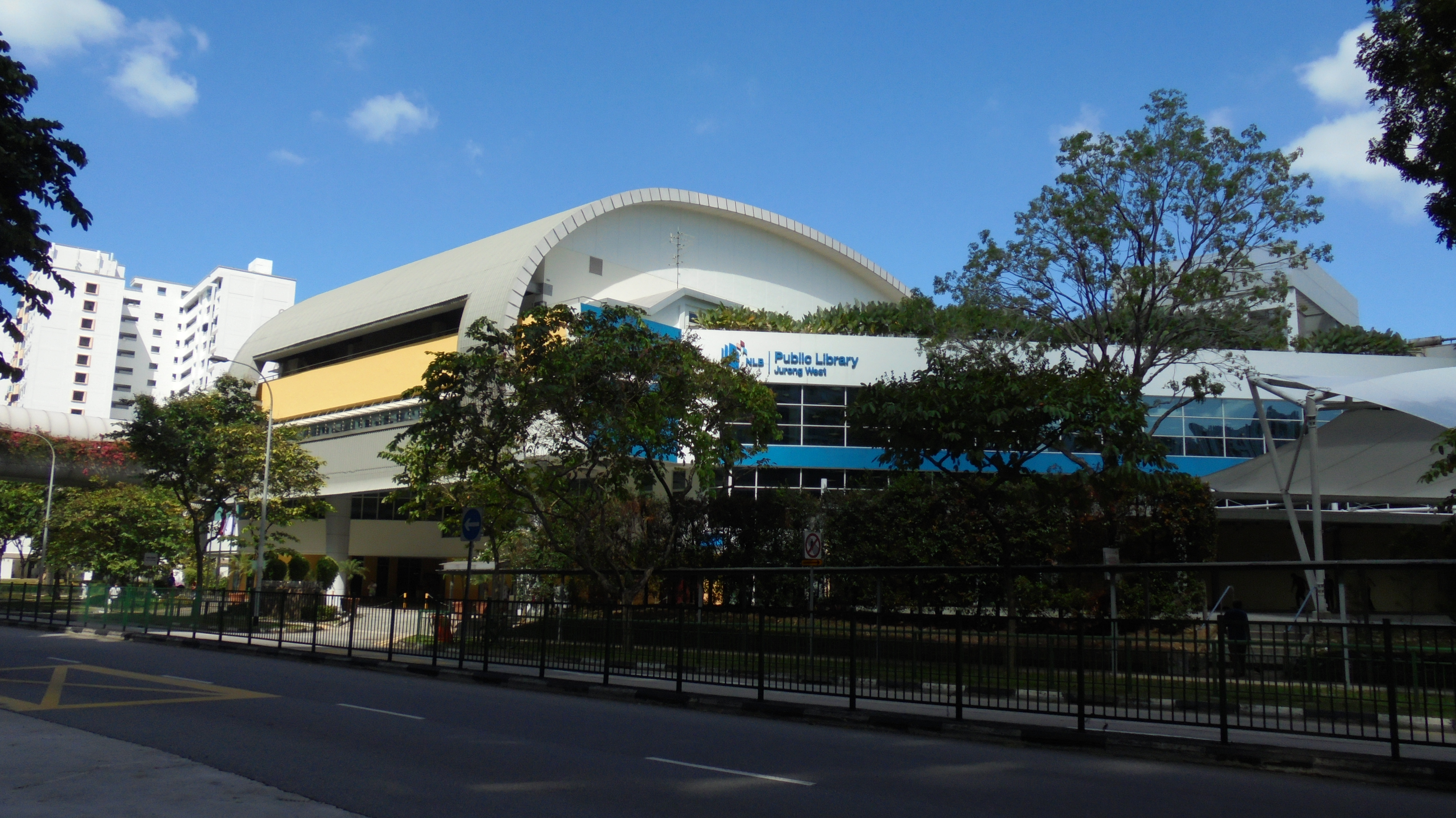
- Jurong West Public Library in January 2020
- 1.3403°N 103.7046°E
- Location: 60 Jurong West Central 3, #01-03, Jurong West Community Building, Singapore 648346, Singapore
- Type: Public library
- Established: 28 March 1996; 30 years ago
- Branch of: National Library Board

Collection
- Size: 268,322

Access and use
- Population served: 200,000

Other information
- Public transit access: EW27 Boon Lay, Boon Lay Bus Interchange
- Website: Official website

Jurong West Public Library is a public library in Jurong West, Singapore. It is co-located with The Frontier Community Club at Jurong West Community Building. The nearest MRT station is Boon Lay. It is the first public library owned by the National Library Board to be located inside a mall.

== History ==
The library was originally called Jurong West Community Library. It was officially opened on 28 March 1996 by Mr Ho Kah Leong, who was the then Senior Parliamentary Secretary for Ministry of Environment and Member of Parliament for Jurong. The library was located at Jurong Point. It was relocated to The Frontier Community Place after being closed for 2 months. It reopened on 10 March 2006. It was renamed as Jurong West Public Library after the renovation. It currently has 3 levels and is integrated with the community centre.

== Layout ==
The library consists of three levels. The first level contains adult and young adult materials, the second level contains further children's materials and family planning information, and the third level contains adult fiction and non-fiction.

=== Level 1 ===
- Adult's collection
  - Fiction
  - AV materials
  - Magazines
- Young People's collection
  - AV materials
- Children's collection
  - AV materials

=== Level 2 ===
- Children's collection
  - Non fiction
    - Information books
      - English
      - Chinese
      - Malay
      - Tamil
  - Fiction
    - English
      - Chinese
      - Malay
      - Tamil
  - Singapore collection
  - Books for babies
- Adult's collection
  - Family & parenting

=== Level 3 ===
- Adult's collection
  - Fiction
    - English
    - Chinese
    - Malay
    - Tamil
  - Non fiction
    - Business & finance
    - Recreation
    - IT
    - Arts
    - Cooking
    - Recreation
  - Comics
    - Manga

== See also ==
- National Library Board
- List of libraries in Singapore
- Jurong Library
