= No religion =

No religion may refer to:

- Irreligion, absence of, or indifference towards religion
- Atheism, the absence of belief of the existence of deities
- Agnosticism, the position that the existence of deities is unknown or unknowable
- No Religious Test Clause, found in Article VI, paragraph 3 of the U.S. Constitution
- "No Religion", a song by Van Morrison from his album Days Like This
- "No Religion", a song by Asia from their album XXX
