= Boon Lay Bus Interchange =

Bus interchange in Singapore

Boon Lay Bus Interchange 文礼巴士转换站 Pusat Pertukaran Bas Boon Lay
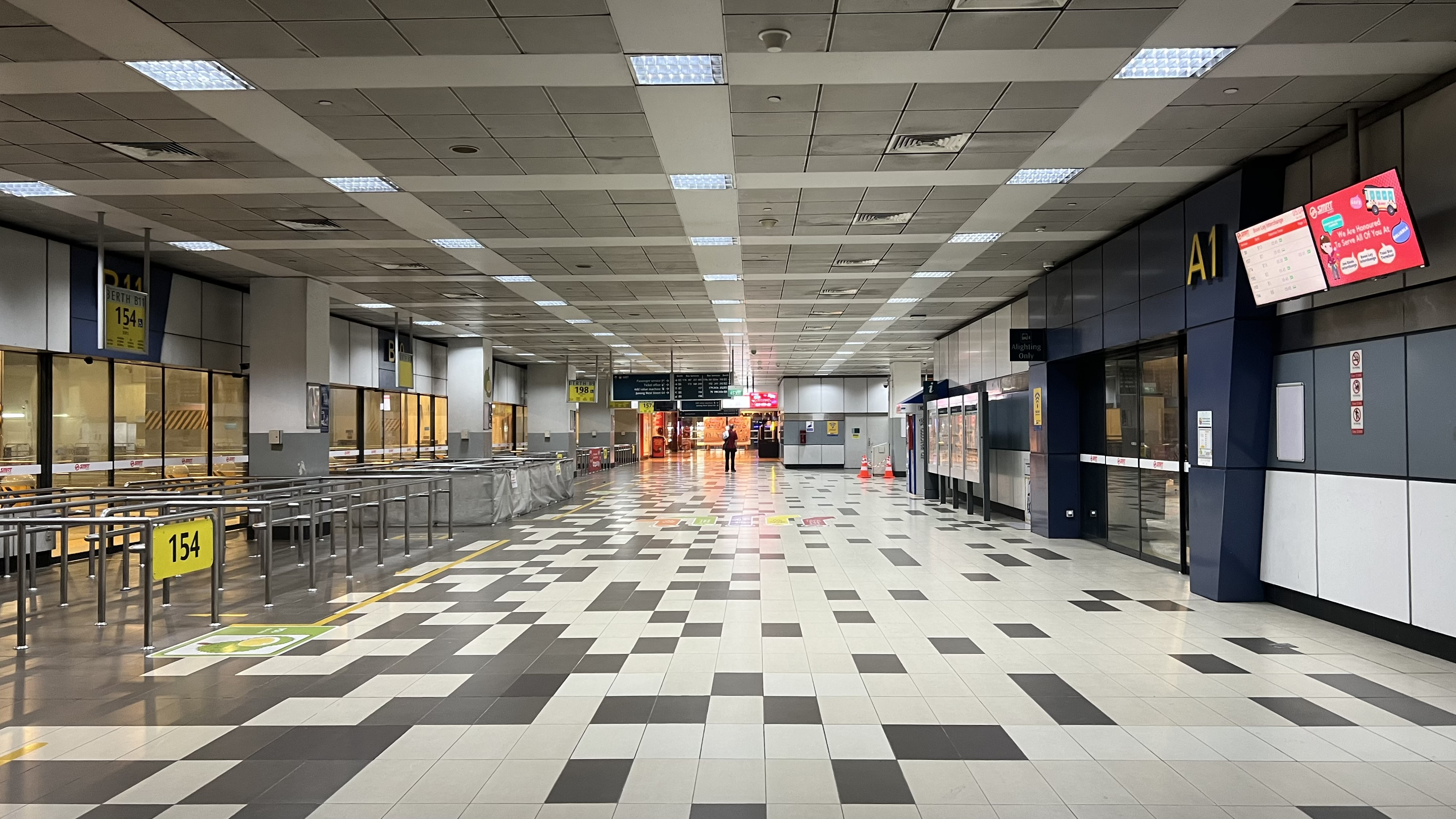
- Interior of Boon Lay Bus Interchange.

General information
- Location: 61 Jurong West Central 3, Singapore 648330
- System: Public Bus Interchange
- Owner: Land Transport Authority
- Operator: SMRT Buses
- Bus routes: 22 (SMRT Buses); 6 (SBS Transit); 1 (Tower Transit Singapore)
- Bus stands: 11 End-on; 6 Sawtooth; 5 Alighting
- Bus operators: SMRT Buses; SBS Transit; Tower Transit Singapore
- Connections: EW27 JS8 Boon Lay

Construction
- Structure type: At-grade
- Accessible: Accessible alighting/boarding points Accessible public toilets Graduated kerb edges Tactile guidance system

History
- Opened: 1 July 1990; 36 years ago (Old); 18 June 2006; 20 years ago (Temporary); 27 December 2009; 16 years ago (Integrated Transport Hub)
- Closed: 17 June 2006; 20 years ago (Old); 7 May 2010; 16 years ago (Temporary)

Key dates
- 1 July 1990: Commenced operations
- 18 June 2006: Operations transferred to Temporary bus interchange
- 27 December 2009: Most operations transferred to new and air-conditioned bus interchange as Integrated Transport Hub
- 8 May 2010: Remaining operations transferred to new and air-conditioned bus interchange as Integrated Transport Hub
- 1 September 2024: Operations transferred to SMRT Buses under the Jurong West Bus Package
Location

Boon Lay Bus Interchange is an air-conditioned bus interchange located in Jurong West Central. It serves the residential estates of Jurong West as well as the industrial areas around Pioneer. Opened in 2009, it is Singapore’s fourth air-conditioned bus interchange and is integrated with Jurong Point shopping centre and The Centris condominium. It is also located a short walk from Boon Lay MRT station.

Nearby public facilities include the Jurong West Community Building and Jurong Central Park. The interchange serves a wide range of passengers, including residents, workers travelling to the Jurong and Tuas industrial estates, and students from Nanyang Technological University. It has long been one of Singapore’s largest and busiest bus interchanges. At its peak, it handled 31 bus services, although several routes were transferred to the newer Joo Koon Bus Interchange in 2015.

== History ==
Boon Lay Bus Interchange began operations on 1 July 1990. It replaced the former Jurong Bus Interchange on Jurong Port Road, with bus services that had previously terminated there being rerouted to Boon Lay. Some services from Jurong East Bus Interchange were also extended to terminate at the new interchange. At the time, both the Jurong West extension and the Tuas industrial area were still largely under development. As these areas grew, more bus services were introduced, and by the early 2000s, around 30 bus services terminated at the interchange.

Next to the former interchange was a vacant plot of land. In 2006, this plot and the land occupied by the interchange were sold together as a ‘White Site’ to Prime Point Development Pte. Ltd. Shortly afterwards, the land occupied by the former interchange was acquired for the construction of the Jurong Point Extension.

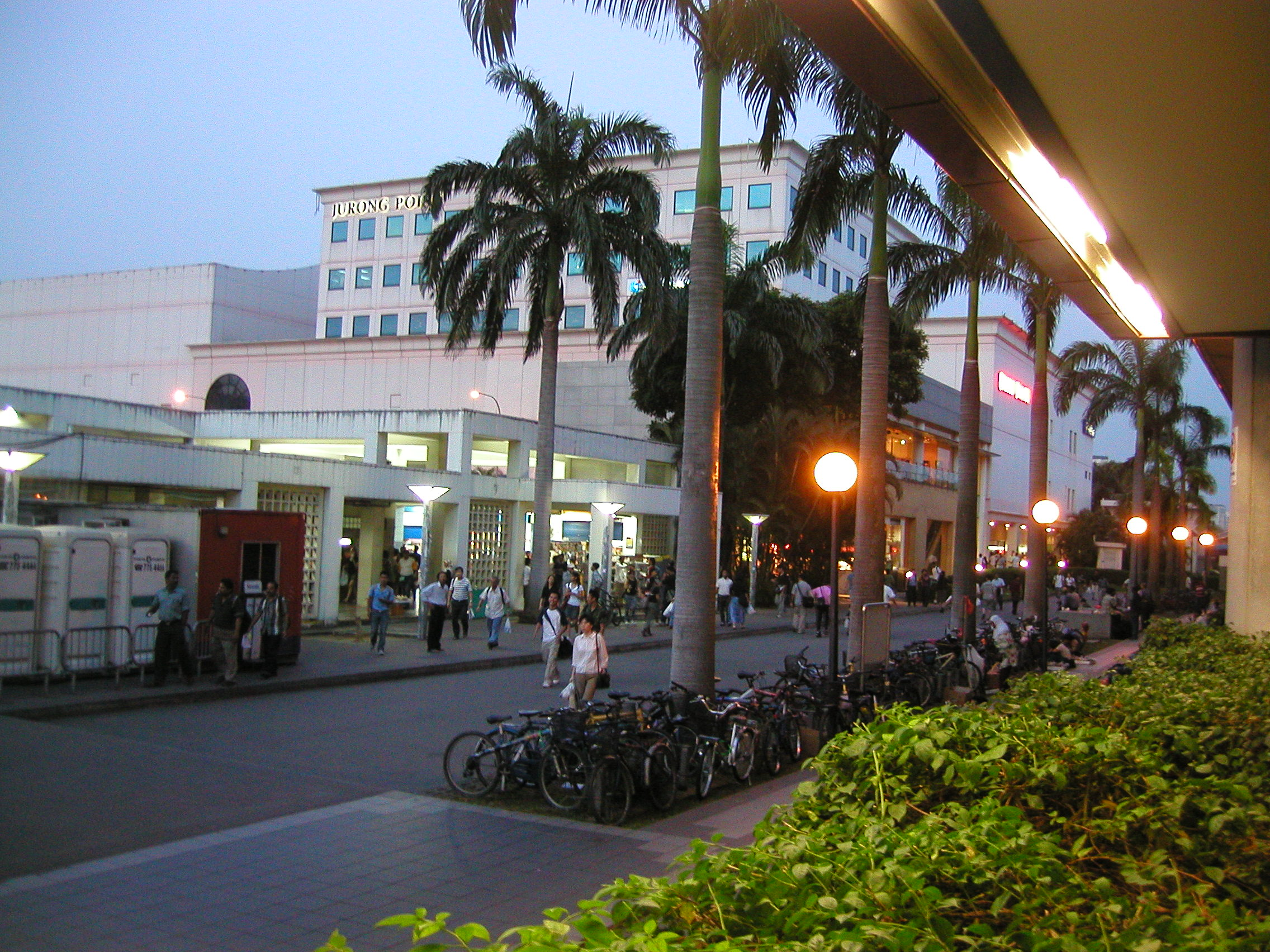
The old bus interchange

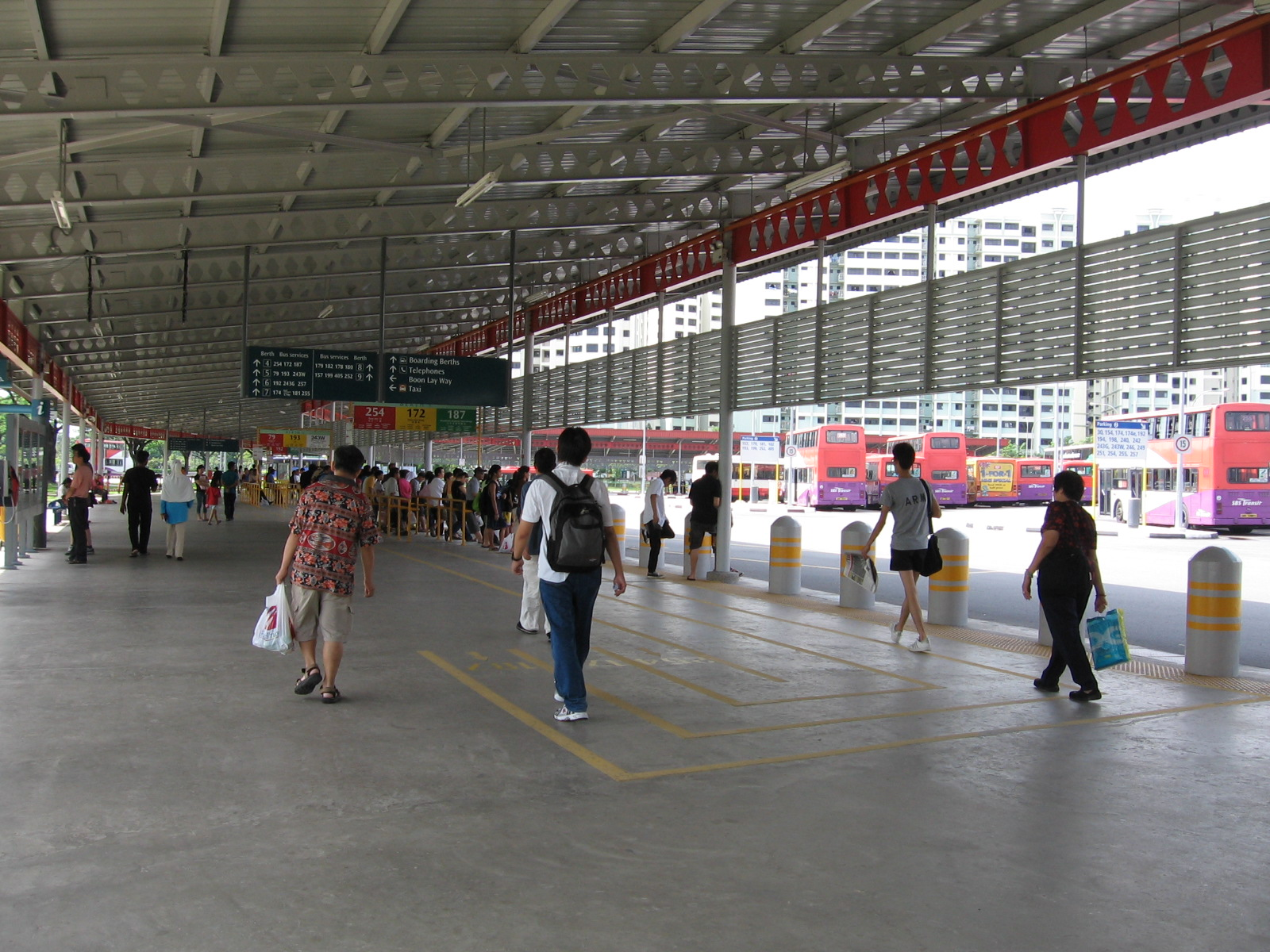
The temporary bus interchange which operated from 18 June 2006 to 26 December 2009

From 18 June 2006 to 26 December 2009, the bus interchange temporarily operated on a vacant plot of land next to Boon Lay MRT station, bounded by Boon Lay Way and Jurong West Street 64, while the original interchange was rebuilt as part of the Jurong Point extension project. The project included the expansion of Jurong Point (JP2), the construction of the new Boon Lay Bus Interchange, and the development of a 16-storey condominium known as The Centris.

On 27 December 2009, the bus interchange returned to its original site, and almost all bus services resumed operations at the newly rebuilt interchange along Jurong West Central 3. However, Services 179, 179A and 199 continued to operate from the temporary interchange until 7 May 2010. Covering more than 20,000 square metres, the new interchange became Singapore’s fourth air-conditioned bus interchange and the first to be located along the East–West MRT Line. It has a total of 60 bus bays and 31 wheelchair-accessible boarding and alighting berths, comprising 22 end-on berths and nine sawtooth berths, of which six are for boarding and three are for alighting. Together with Boon Lay MRT station and Jurong Point, it forms the Boon Lay Integrated Transport Hub.

Following the opening of Joo Koon Bus Interchange on 21 November 2015, bus Services 182, 182M, 254, 255 and 257 were transferred there in phases, helping to reduce overcrowding at Boon Lay Bus Interchange. A further change took place on 18 June 2017 with the opening of the Tuas West Extension. Services 256 and 258 were merged into a single Service 258, which no longer served the interchange.

In 2022, the Land Transport Authority (LTA) announced plans to upgrade the interchange with more inclusive facilities and an improved air-conditioning system.

== Incidents ==
On 23 August 2017, a 17-year-old made a bomb threat and repeatedly issued death threats, while also making racist remarks and using abusive language. The teenager later fled the scene and was arrested two days later at Jurong Point, according to a police statement. The teenager was subsequently diagnosed with a mental health condition and admitted to the Institute of Mental Health (IMH).

== Bus contracting model ==
Under the Bus Contracting Model, all bus services operating from Boon Lay Bus Interchange are grouped into nine bus packages, which are operated by three different bus operators.

Since 1 September 2024, Boon Lay Bus Interchange has been managed by SMRT Buses under a five-year contract.

=== List of bus services ===
Operator	Package	Routes
SBS Transit	Bedok	30
SBS Transit	Bishan-Toa Payoh	157, 157B
SBS Transit	Bukit Merah	198, 198A
SBS Transit	Clementi	174, 174e
SBS Transit	Serangoon-Eunos	154 (until June 2027)
SMRT Buses	Choa Chu Kang-Bukit Panjang	172, 180
SMRT Buses	Jurong West	179, 179A, 181, 181A, 181M, 192, 193, 194, 199, 240, 241, 242, 243G, 243W, 246, 249, 249A, 251, 252, 405
SMRT Buses	Serangoon-Eunos	154 (from June 2027)
SMRT Buses	Woodlands	178, 187
Tower Transit Singapore	Bulim	79
