= Jurong Point =

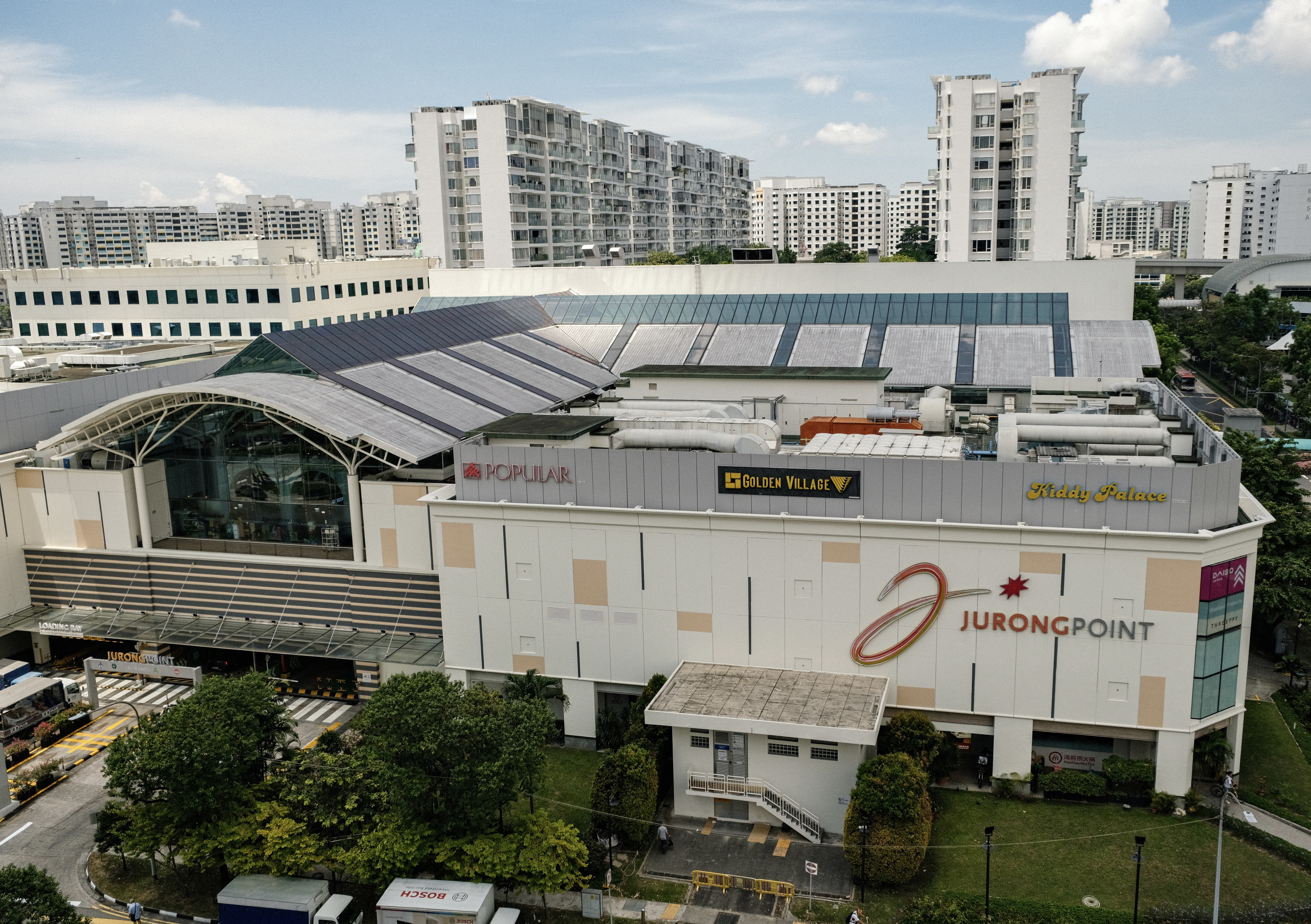
- Jurong Point
- Location: Jurong West Central, Jurong West, Singapore
- Coordinates: 1°20′24″N 103°42′23″E
- Address: 1 Jurong West Central 2
- Opened: 7 December 1995; 30 years ago (Original mall); 10 December 2008; 17 years ago (New wing)
- Developer: Prime Point Realty Development Private Limited
- Owner: Link REIT
- Num. of stores: 450
- Num. of anchor tenants: 9
- Floor area: 750,000 square feet (70,000 m^{2})
- Floors: 9
- Public transit: EW27 JS8 Boon Lay
- Website: Jurong Point

Jurong Point (Note: Malay: Titik Jurong; Chinese: 裕廊坊; Tamil: ஜூராங் பாயிண்ட்) is a large regional shopping mall in the subzone of Jurong West Central within Jurong West, Singapore. The complex stands adjacent to the Boon Lay MRT station and the Boon Lay Bus Interchange. It is currently the largest shopping mall in Singapore by the total number of tenants, the largest mall in western Singapore, and the third-largest shopping mall by net shopping floor space nationwide, following VivoCity and Suntec City. The property features more than 450 retail and food and beverage outlets distributed across six levels.

== History ==
Jurong Point first opened its doors in December 1995 with 95 retailers including Courts, Golden Village, NTUC FairPrice, Kopitiam, Old Chang Kee, Harvey Norman (previously SAFE superstore) and Soo Kee Jewellery. Majority of these retailers were setting up shop in a mall environment for the first time and have not moved out since then. The mall once housed the Jurong West Public Library, which was then the first public library in Singapore to be located in a shopping mall.

Since its opening, the mall has undergone two expansions. In 1998, an additional 150,000 square feet (14,000 m^{2}) of space was successfully secured for the first extension of Jurong Point, which opened in December 2000, adding more than 160 new tenants. This also brought major department store John Little. In 2005, Jurong West Public Library moved out to the adjacent community club and its premises, along with Levels 5 and 6 were reconfigured into a community hub.

In 2006, the mall underwent a major expansion, which included building a new retail wing (JP2), the air conditioned Boon Lay Bus Interchange and a residential development, The Centris. The new wing, containing 230 shops, opened in December 2008. The original mall was subsequently renamed as JP1. This also brought in several new anchor tenants, including an NTUC Fairprice Xtra hypermarket and child-care centre operator My First Skool. The number of parking lots increased three-fold from 415 to 1,425. The Centris was completed in August 2009, followed by the Boon Lay Bus Interchange in December that year.

John Little closed its last suburban store there in July 2016 and was replaced by BHG, which opened in December that year. Operations closed down on 13 February 2022. Also replaced is Timezone on the second floor and Haidilao on the first floor. NTUC FairPrice operations at the first basement floor closed down on 21 June 2022 and replaced by Don Don Donki (however, NTUC FairPrice operations at the third floor of JP2 are still ongoing). Cotton On closed down operations on 1 April 2025, after the 15-year lease expired, it was replaced by Teo Heng KTV.

== Gallery ==
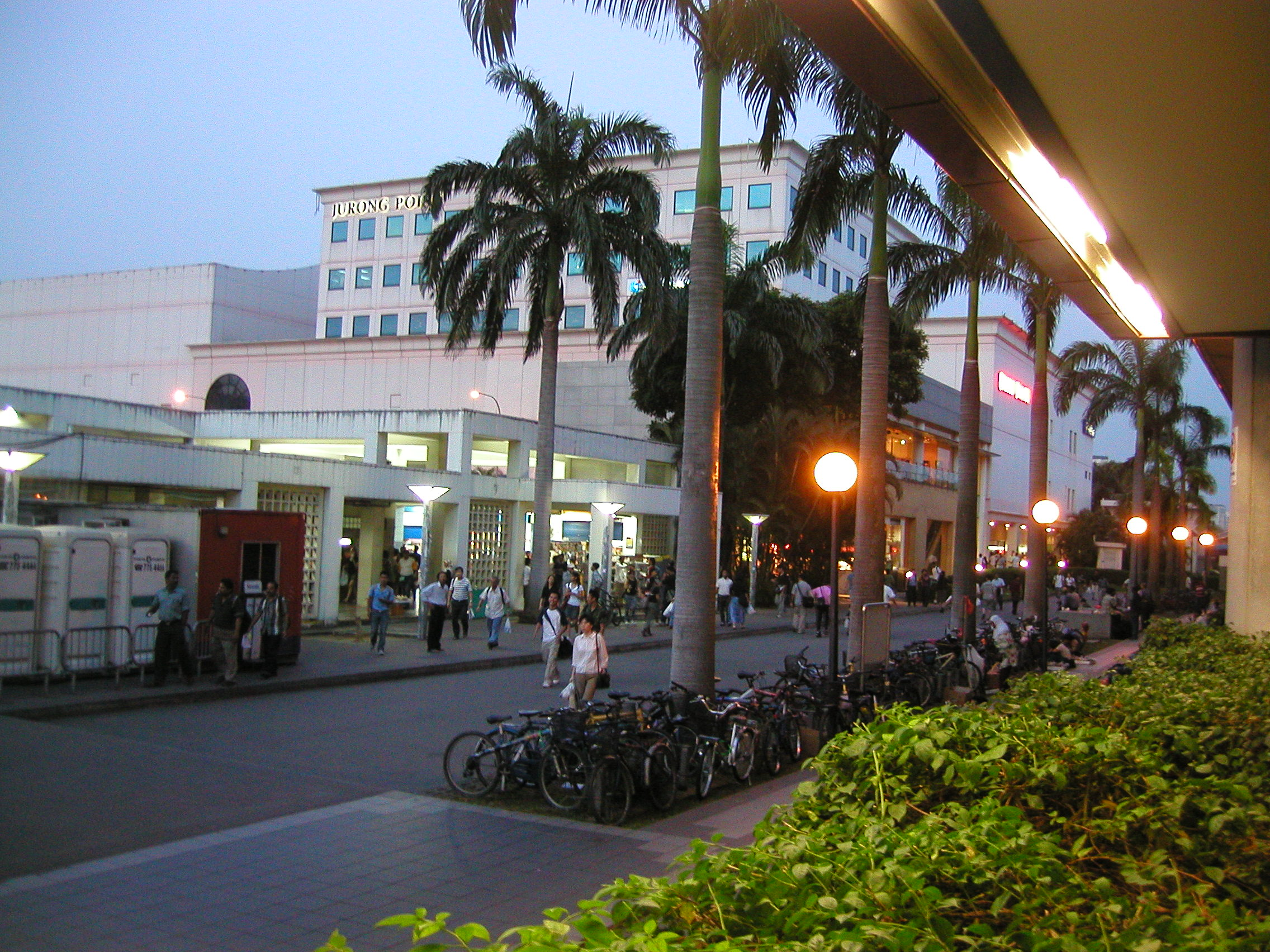
Old building of Jurong Point

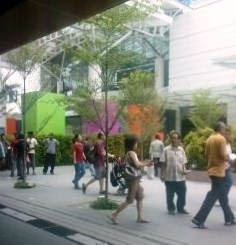
View of new building
