= Pioneer MRT station =

Mass Rapid Transit station in Singapore

Pioneer EW28 先驱 பயனியர்
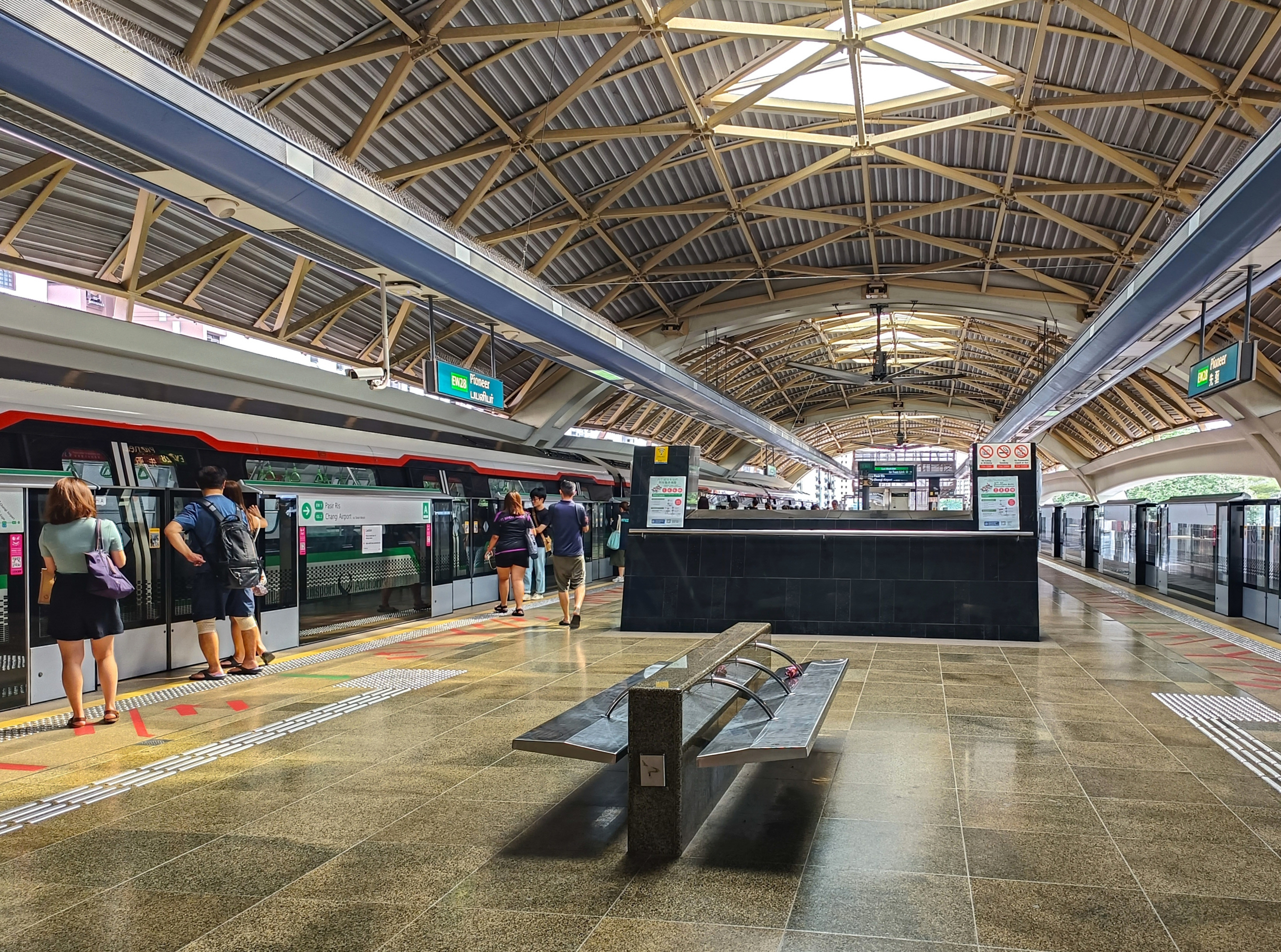
- The island platform of Pioneer station

General information
- Location: 31 Jurong West Street 63; Singapore 648310
- Coordinates: 1°20′15.28″N 103°41′49.98″E
- System: Mass Rapid Transit (MRT) station
- Operator: SMRT Trains Ltd (SMRT Corporation)
- Line: East–West Line
- Platforms: 2 (1 island platform)
- Tracks: 2
- Connections: Bus, Taxi

Construction
- Structure type: Elevated
- Platform levels: 1
- Parking: No
- Cycle facilities: Yes
- Accessible: Yes

History
- Opened: 28 February 2009; 17 years ago

Passengers
- June 2024: 27,013 per day

Services
Preceding station	Mass Rapid Transit	Following station
Boon Lay towards Pasir Ris	East–West Line	Joo Koon towards Tuas Link
Track layout
Location
- Location within Singapore Rail

Pioneer MRT station is a Mass Rapid Transit station in Singapore. It is part of the East–West Line and serves the residential estate of Pioneer. The station is located along Jurong West Street 63 and provides a convenient mode of transportation for residents and visitors to the area.

Despite its name, Pioneer station is not physically located within the Pioneer planning area. Rather, its name was derived from Pioneer Road North, a major road to the west of the station that travels in the north–south direction. Pioneer station is currently the nearest MRT station to the Nanyang Technological University until 2029 when Nanyang Gateway and Nanyang Crescent stations along the Jurong Region Line opens.

It is one of two above-ground stations on the MRT network with a privacy screen built along the track of the eastbound platform to ensure the privacy of nearby residents; the other station is Marsiling MRT station.

== History ==
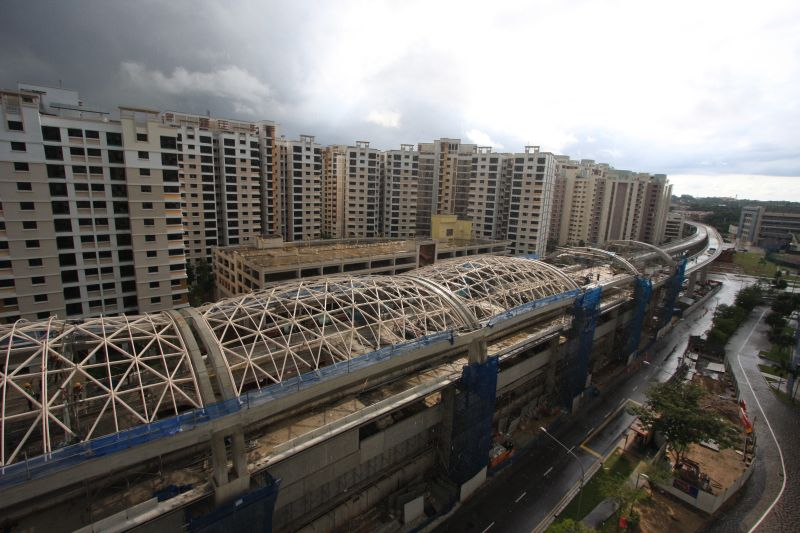
Pioneer station during construction

Built along with Joo Koon, it was part of the Boon Lay Extension (BLE) project announced by the Land Transport Authority in December 2004 to help people working in the Jurong Industrial Area travel faster.

The station opened on 28 February 2009 and following the opening, SBS Transit introduced a new feeder bus service 241 to provide bridging services for the N9 residents and the Land Transport Authority carried out amendments and additions (A&A) works on Pioneer Road North, such as expanding the road and constructing an overhead pedestrian ramp bridge, as complements to the station to serve the residents of Nanyang and Pioneer.

As with most above-ground stations built in the past along the East–West Line, it was initially built without platform screen doors that prevent commuters from falling onto the train tracks. Installation of the half-height screen doors eventually started on 21 June 2011. By 24 August that year, all of the screen doors were installed and began operations.

The station was installed with high-volume low-speed fans, which commenced operations on 10 June 2012. It was the second station, after Tampines to have them installed.
