= Boon Lay MRT station =

Mass Rapid Transit station in Singapore

Boon Lay EW27 JS8 文礼 பூன் லே
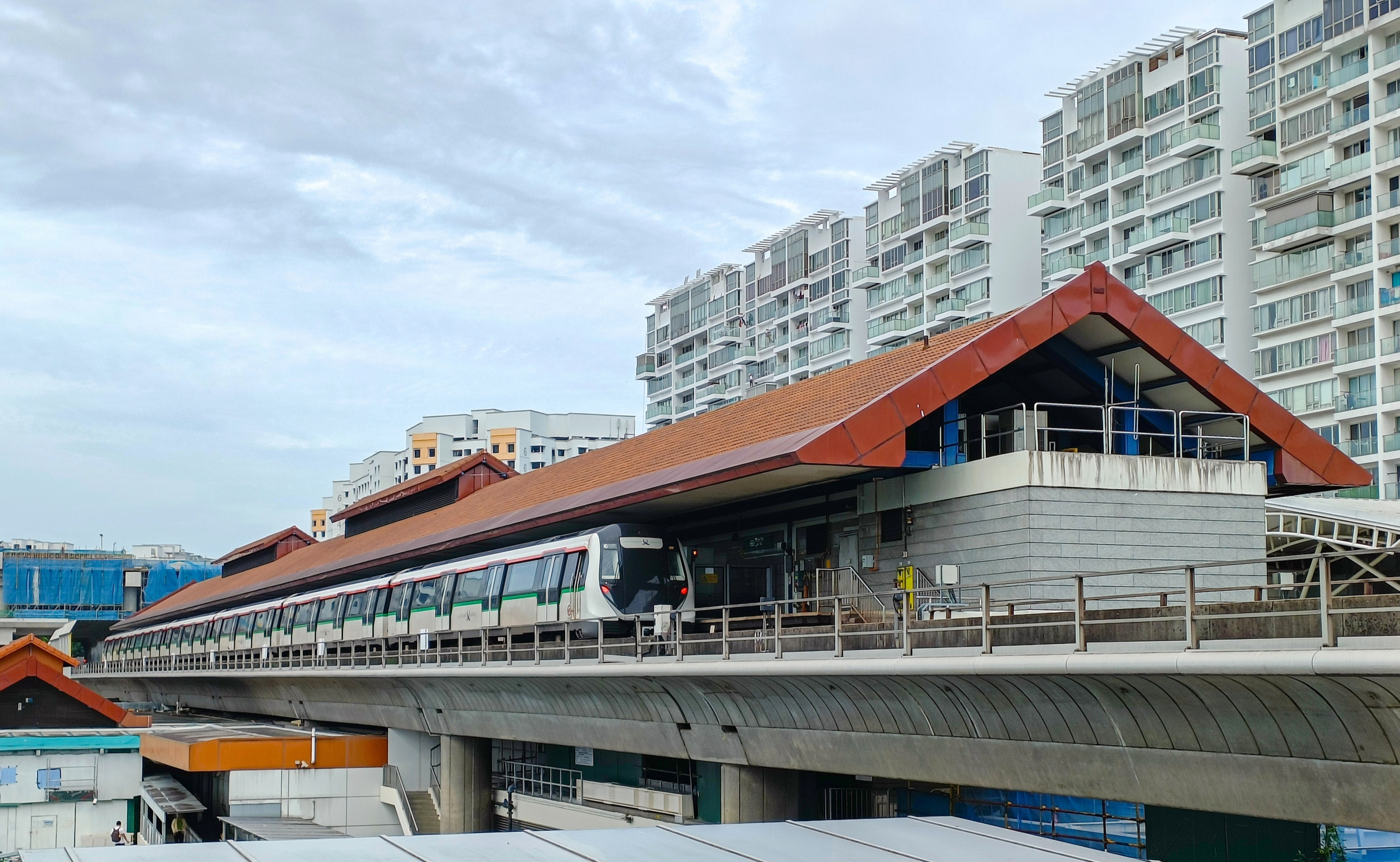
- Exterior of the station

General information
- Location: 301 Boon Lay Way, Singapore 649846 (EWL); 100 Jurong West Street 64, Singapore 649657 (JRL)
- Coordinates: 01°20′19″N 103°42′21″E
- System: Mass Rapid Transit (MRT) station
- Owner: Land Transport Authority
- Operator: SMRT Trains (East–West Line); Singapore One Rail (Jurong Region Line)
- Line: East–West Line Jurong Region Line
- Platforms: 2 (1 island platform) + 2 (1 island platform) (U/C)
- Tracks: 2 + 2 (U/C)
- Connections: Boon Lay, Taxi

Construction
- Structure type: Elevated
- Platform levels: 1 + 1 (U/C)
- Parking: Yes (Jurong Point)
- Cycle facilities: Yes
- Accessible: Yes

Other information
- Station code: BNL

History
- Opened: 6 July 1990; 36 years ago (East–West Line)
- Opening: mid-2028; 2 years' time (Jurong Region Line)
- Former names: Jurong West

Passengers
- June 2024: 41,195 per day

Services
Preceding station	Mass Rapid Transit	Following station
Lakeside towards Pasir Ris	East–West Line	Pioneer towards Tuas Link
Bahar Junction towards Tawas	Jurong Region Line Future service	Terminus
Bahar Junction towards Peng Kang Hill	Jurong Region Line Future service	Enterprise towards Jurong Pier
Track layout
Location
- Location within Singapore Rail

Boon Lay MRT Station is a Mass Rapid Transit (MRT) station on the East–West Line (EWL) in Jurong West, Singapore. Located along Boon Lay Way, the station is directly connected to the Boon Lay Bus Interchange and Jurong Point shopping centre, forming the Boon Lay Integrated Transport Hub. Other nearby landmarks include the SAFRA Clubhouse, Jurong West Public Library, and Jurong Medical Center.

The station was originally announced as Jurong West, but plans for it were briefly put on hold before being reinstated in August 1987. It opened on 6 July 1990 as part of the East–West Line (EWL) and was the last station to be completed on Singapore's original MRT network. The station served as the western terminus of the EWL until the line was extended to Joo Koon station in 2009. In May 2018, it was announced that the station would become an interchange with the Jurong Region Line when the first phase of that line opens in mid-2028.

== History ==
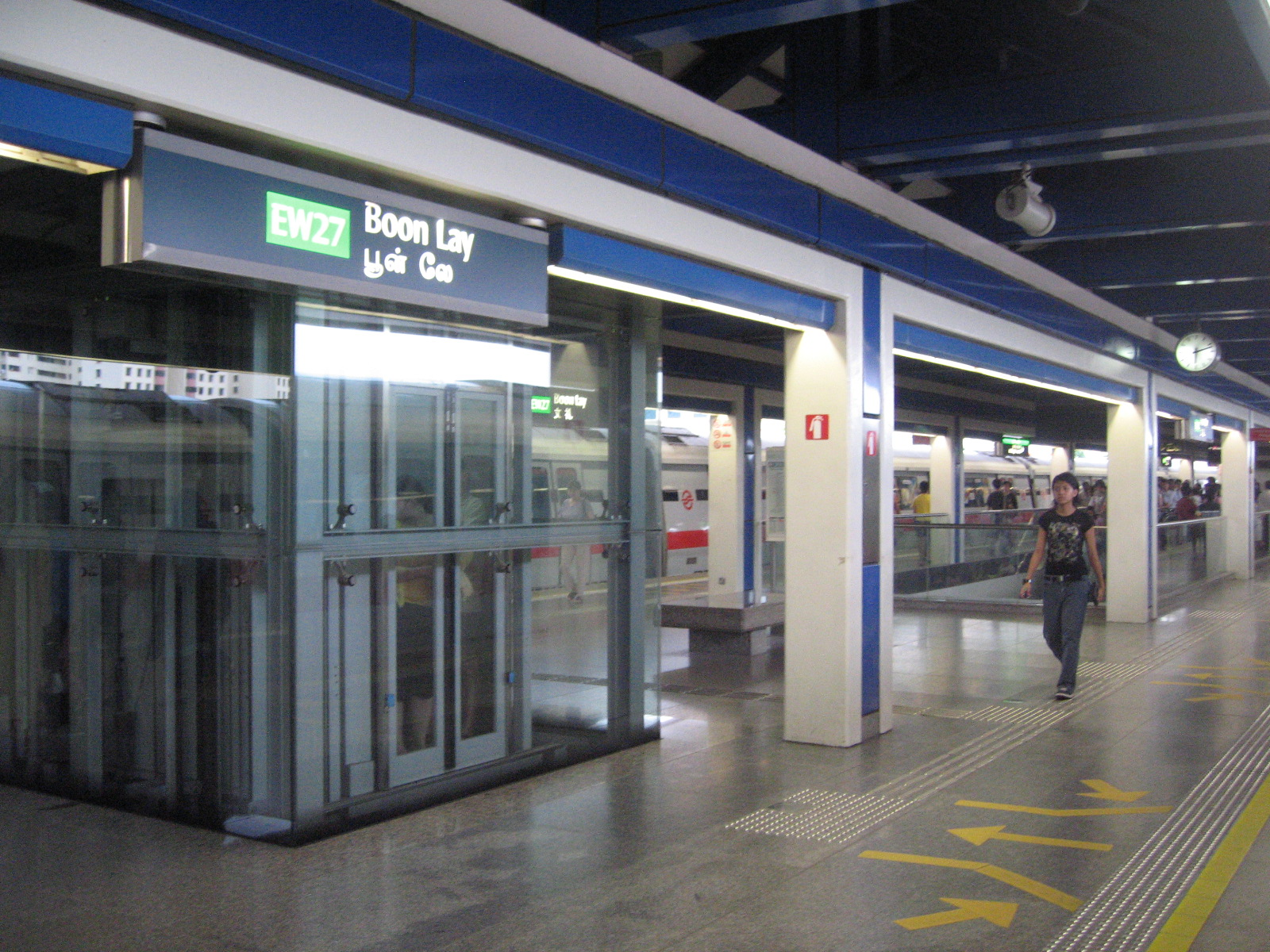
EWL platforms of Boon Lay station before the installation of platform screen doors

The station, then known as Jurong West, was included in the early plans for the MRT network in May 1982 and was due to be built as part of Phase II of the initial MRT system. However, in March 1986, the MRT Corporation (MRTC) announced that construction had been postponed because of delays to the Housing and Development Board's (HDB) development plans for the area. Telecommunications cables and antenna facilities had to be relocated before Jurong West New Town could be expanded, a process expected to take six years. After the HDB reached an agreement with Telecoms to vacate the site and decided to proceed with the development, the MRTC announced on 7 August 1987 that construction of the station would go ahead.

The contract to build Boon Lay station and 1.4 kilometres (0.87 miles) of viaducts was awarded in May 1988 to a joint venture between RSEA International and Hock Lian Seng Engineering for S$34.19 million (equivalent to US$44 million in 2021). On 12 August 1989, the final viaduct beam between Boon Lay and Lakeside stations was installed, marking the completion of all viaduct works for the initial MRT system. On 10 March 1990, it was announced that the station would open on 6 July. Before the station opened, the Boon Lay Bus Interchange began operations on 1 July, allowing passengers to transfer more conveniently between buses and the MRT. The completion of the initial MRT system and the opening of the station were celebrated at a ceremony held at the Westin Stamford hotel in Raffles City.

In 2002, new pick-up and drop-off points were built outside the station after many motorists had been stopping or parking along Jurong West Street 64. In 2012, half-height platform screen doors were installed as part of the Land Transport Authority's (LTA) programme to improve safety at MRT stations. Between 2012 and 2013, high-volume, low-speed fans were installed above the platforms as part of a nationwide programme to improve ventilation at station platforms.

=== Boon Lay Extension ===
Plans to extend the MRT to either Tuas or the Nanyang Technological University (NTU) were first announced in 1994. The 3.8-kilometre (2.4-mile) Boon Lay MRT Extension (BLE) was approved in December 2004 to meet the growing demand for public transport in the Jurong Industrial Estate. After the extension opened on 28 February 2009, it was reported that it had reduced overcrowding at Boon Lay station, as some private bus operators had moved their services to Joo Koon station.

=== Jurong Region Line ===
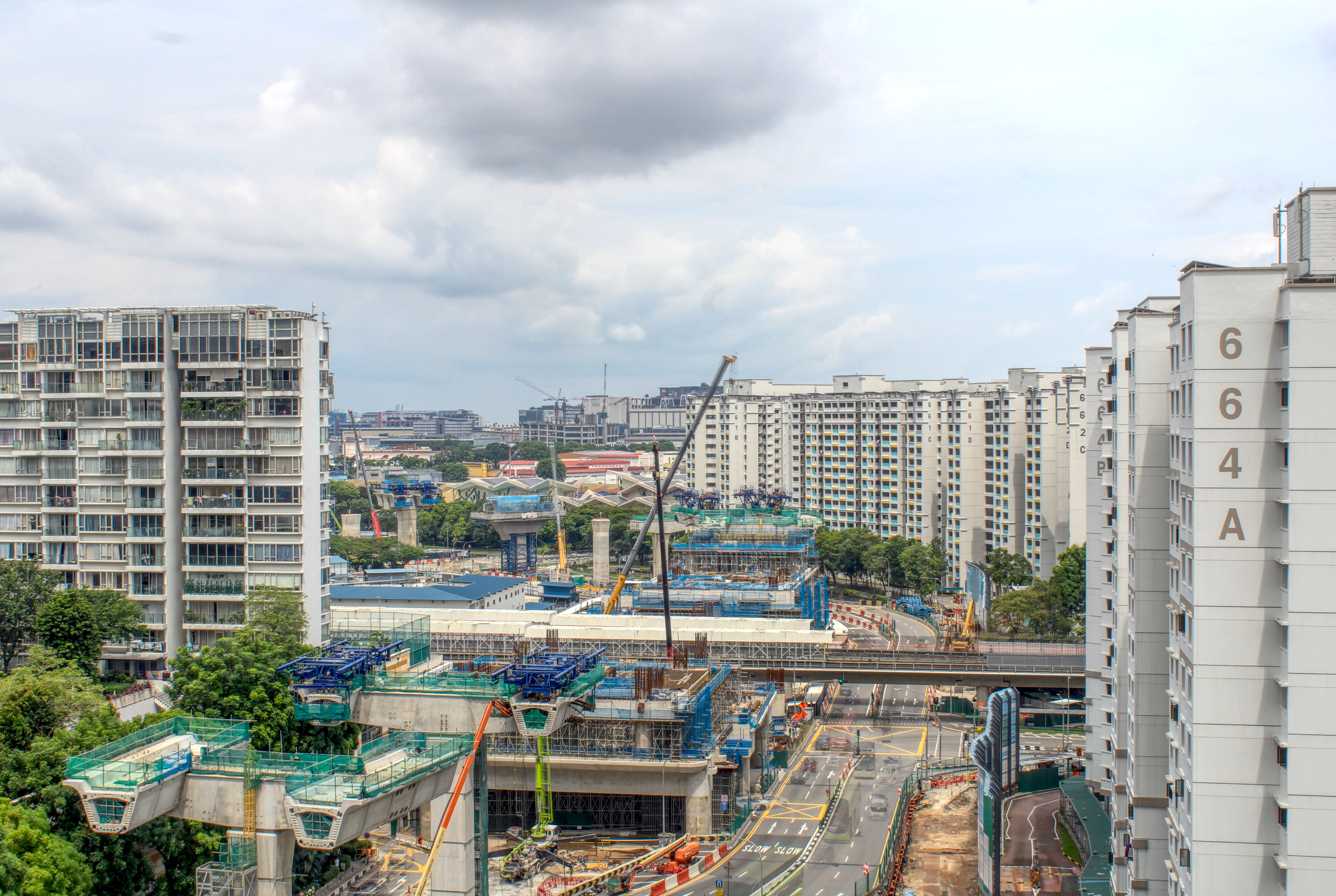
Construction site of the JRL station in May 2024

On 9 May 2018, the LTA announced that Boon Lay station would become an interchange with the proposed 24-kilometre (15 mi) Jurong Region Line (JRL). The station is being built as part of Stage 1 (JRL West), which includes 10 stations between Choa Chu Kang and Bahar Junction, as well as two branch lines serving Tawas and Boon Lay. This stage was originally expected to open in 2026. However, construction restrictions during the COVID-19 pandemic caused delays, pushing the completion date back to 2027. Further delays to construction and testing later postponed the opening to the middle of 2028.

In February 2020, the contract to design and build Boon Lay JRL station and its associated viaducts was awarded to China Communications Construction Company Limited (Singapore Branch) for S$172 million (US$126.08 million).

To make way for the construction of the JRL, road diversion works along Jurong West Street 64 began in June 2022. At the same time, a bicycle park near the station was relocated. Piling works took place between August and December 2022, and a temporary protective enclosure was installed over the East West Line (EWL) tracks. The installation of viaduct segments began in February 2023.

== Station details ==
Boon Lay MRT station serves the East West Line (EWL) and is located between Lakeside and Pioneer stations. Its station code is EW27. As part of the EWL, the station is operated by SMRT Trains. In the future, Boon Lay will become an interchange station with the Jurong Region Line (JRL), where it will be situated between Bahar Junction and Enterprise stations. The EWL station is located along Boon Lay Way, while the JRL station is being built along Jurong West Street 64.

The station is integrated with Boon Lay Bus Interchange and Jurong Point shopping centre as part of the Boon Lay Integrated Transport Hub. Nearby landmarks include the Jurong West Community Building, SAFRA Clubhouse (Jurong), and Jurong West Public Library.

The station also features a mural as part of SMRT's Comic Connect programme, a public art initiative showcasing heritage-themed murals created by local artists. The mural at Boon Lay station was designed by local artist Muhammed Nurman bin Selamat. It mainly depicts businessman Chew Boon Lay, after whom the area is named. The artwork also portrays the area's rubber plantations during the early 20th century, Tuas Pek Kong Keng Temple, the headquarters of ST Engineering, and Boon Lay Shopping Centre.

== Gallery ==
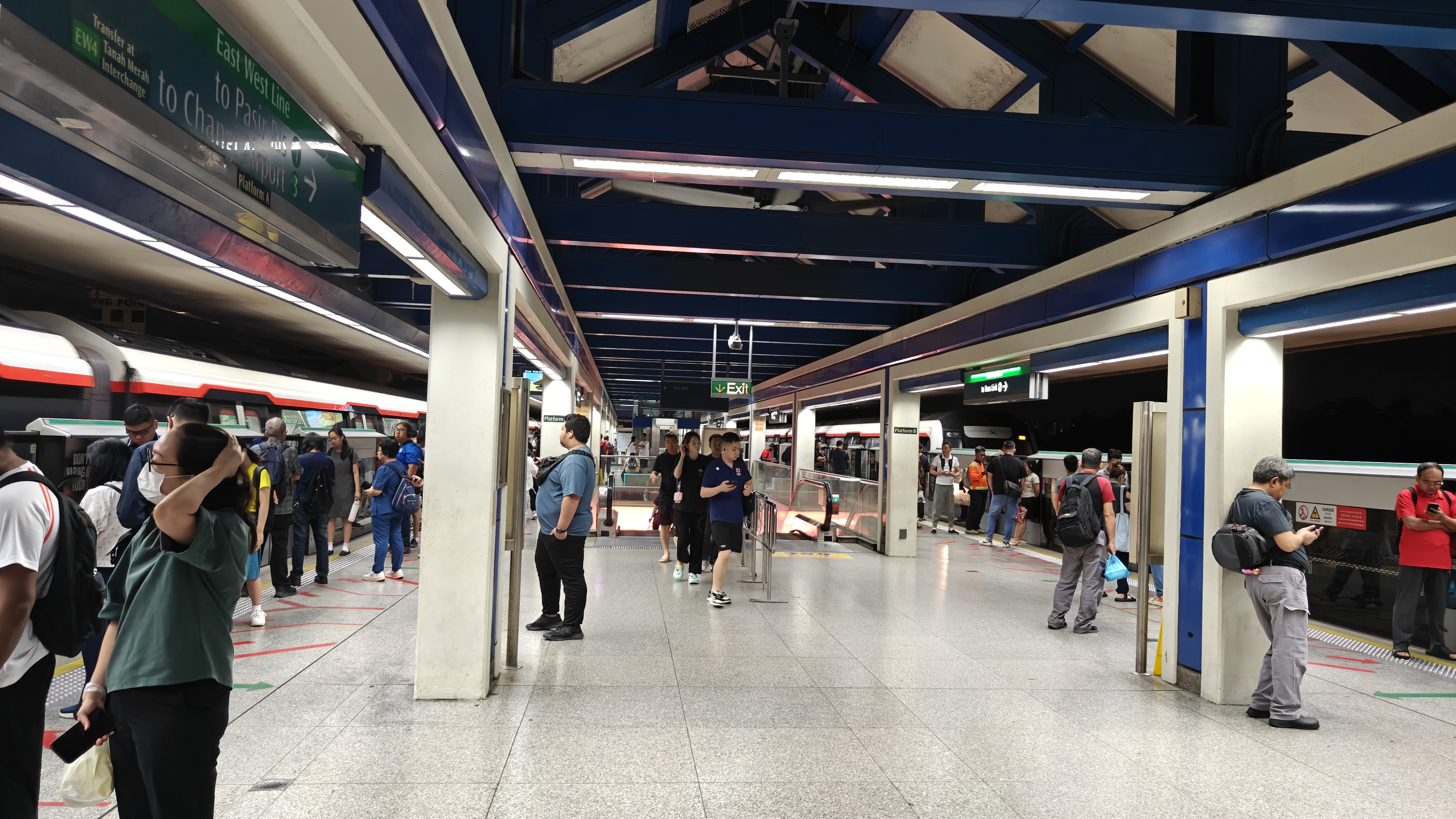
Platform view of Boon Lay station at night. An Alstom Movia R151 can be seen on the left platform and another one pulling into the right platform.

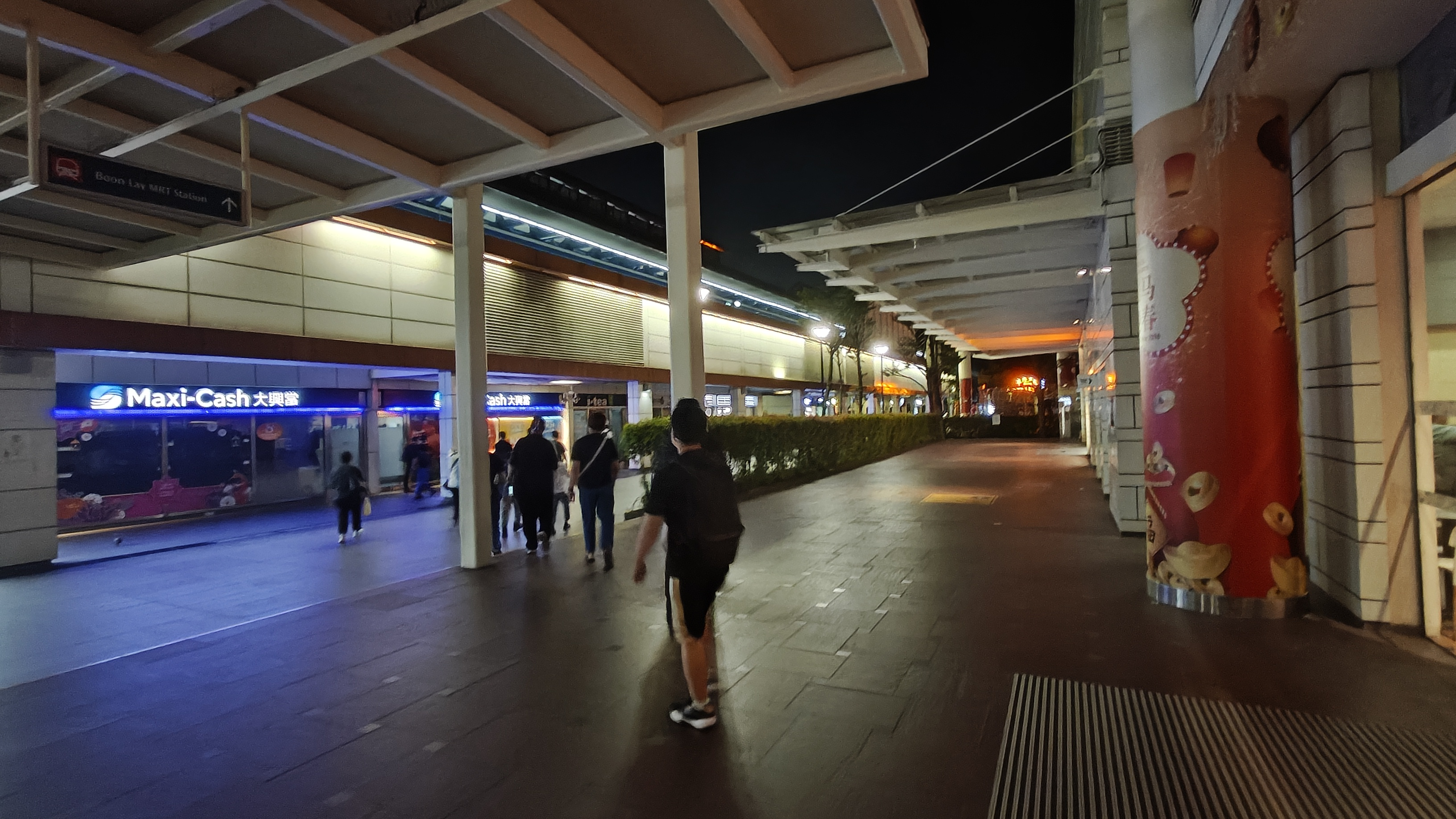
Exterior view of Boon Lay station, at night.
