= Safti =

SAFTI
- Subzone of Jurong West
- SAFTI Live Firing Area

Name transcription(s)
- Country: Singapore

Government
  - Mayor: South West CDC: Low Yen Ling
  - Members of Parliament: West Coast GRC

SAFTI (Singapore Armed Forces Training Institute) is a subzone of the Jurong West planning area of Singapore. It is home to the Pasir Laba Camp. It is also the training ground and a live-firing area for Singapore Armed Forces known as SAFTI Live Firing Area which is west of Pasir Laba Camp.

It is bounded west of Upper Jurong Road and south of the Pan Island Expressway.

== Geography ==
There are some hills in Pasir Laba. They are Peng Kang Hill, FOFO Hill, Bunker Hill and Elephant Hill.

== Accessibility ==
It is accessible by route 182/182M from Joo Koon Bus Interchange.

== Politics ==
Prior to 1997 general elections, it is under the Jurong constituency. From 1997 to 2001, it is bounded by Bukit Timah GRC and Hong Kah GRC. From 2001 to 2011, it is bounded by West Coast GRC and Hong Kah GRC, then from 2011 to 2020, it surrounds the boundaries of Chua Chu Kang GRC and West Coast GRC. Since 2020 general elections, it is fully under West Coast GRC.
