= Kian Teck =

- Subzone of Jurong West Planning Area

Name transcription(s)
  - Chinese: 建德; Jiàndé (Pinyin); Kiàn-tek (Hokkien POJ)
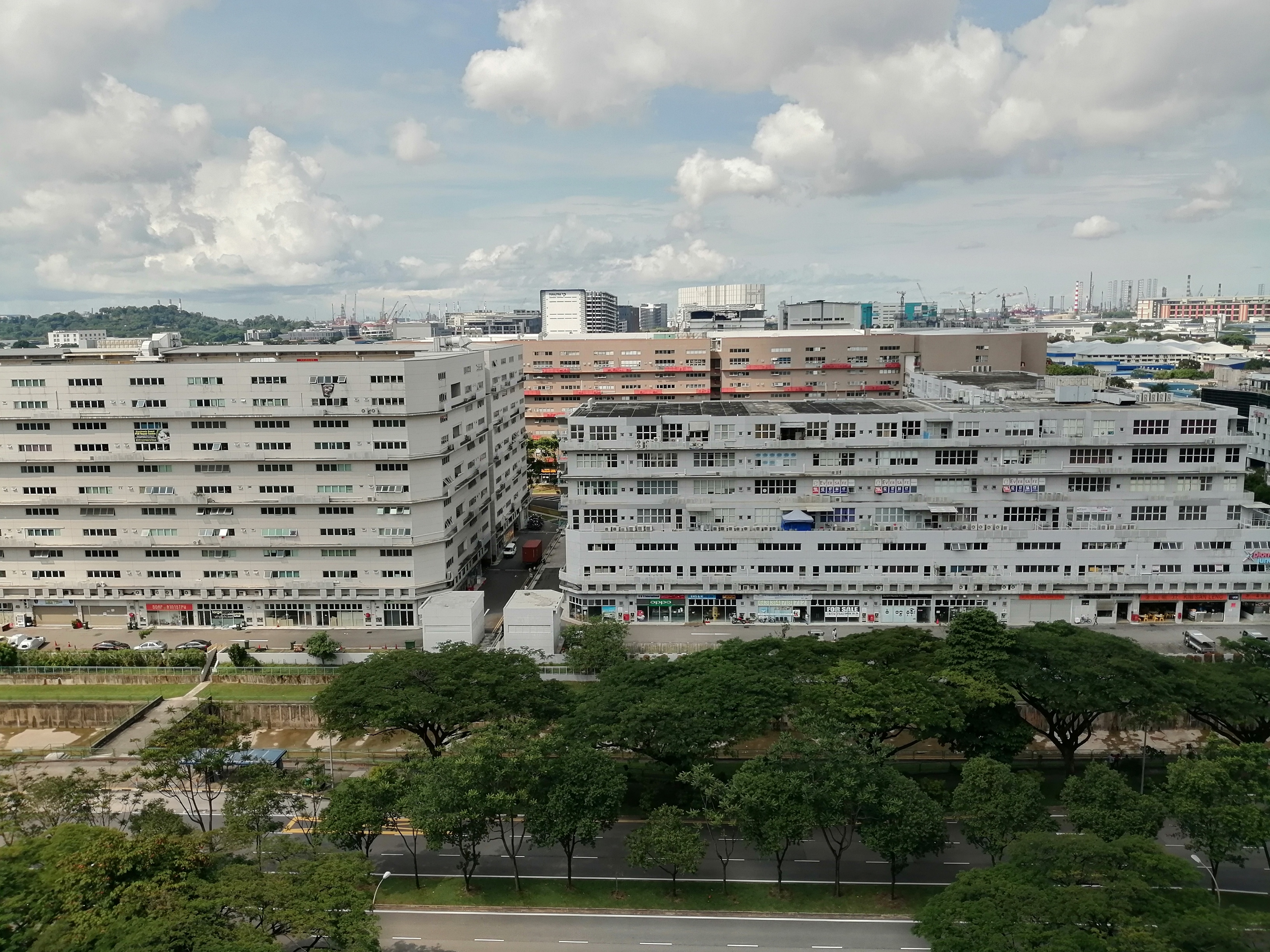
- Interactive map of Kian Teck
- Coordinates: 1.3306°N 103.6912°E
- Country: Singapore

Area
  - Total: 2.10 km^{2} (0.81 sq mi)

Population (2026)
  - Total: 30
  - Density: 14/km^{2} (37/sq mi)

Kian Teck (IPA: /ˈkjɛn tɛk/ KYEN tek, Chinese: 建德) is an area in Jurong Industrial Estate in Singapore. It is in between Joo Koon and Boon Lay stations. It is home to many dormitories which houses foreign workers as well as factories and warehouses. Arena Country Club is also located within the industrial estate.

== Bus Services ==
These bus services plies Kian Teck area along Pioneer Road North, Upper Jurong Road, Kian Teck Road and International Road. All the bus services are operated by SBS Transit.

Following the opening of Joo Koon Bus Interchange in late 2015, several bus routes were amended to better serve the industrial areas in the west and the updated list of bus services plying the Kian Teck area are shown below.

- 252 plies along International Road
- 99, 192 and 974 plies along Upper Jurong Road
- 193, 251, 258, 258M, 185, 502 ply along Pioneer Road North with 185 and 502 terminating at the nearby Soon Lee Bus Depot, 258 and 258M plying Pioneer station which is the nearest Mass Rapid Transit station from the precinct

== Mass Rapid Transit services ==
The area is within walking distance to Pioneer station.
