= J-Walk (pedestrian network) =

Elevated walkways in Jurong East, Singapore

J-Walk is a network of elevated walkways and at-grade sheltered walkways that connects various transportation nodes and commercial developments in Jurong East, Singapore.

J-Walk mainly starts from Jurong East MRT, with connections to Jem, Westgate, Perennial Business City, Ng Teng Fong General Hospital, Devan Nair Institute, and IMM in the west. In addition, the station's southern end connects to two bus interchanges, Jurong East Bus Interchange and Jurong Town Hall Bus Interchange, and also The JTC Summit.
