= Pandan Strait =

Strait south of Singapore

Coordinates: 1°14′58″N 103°43′45″E

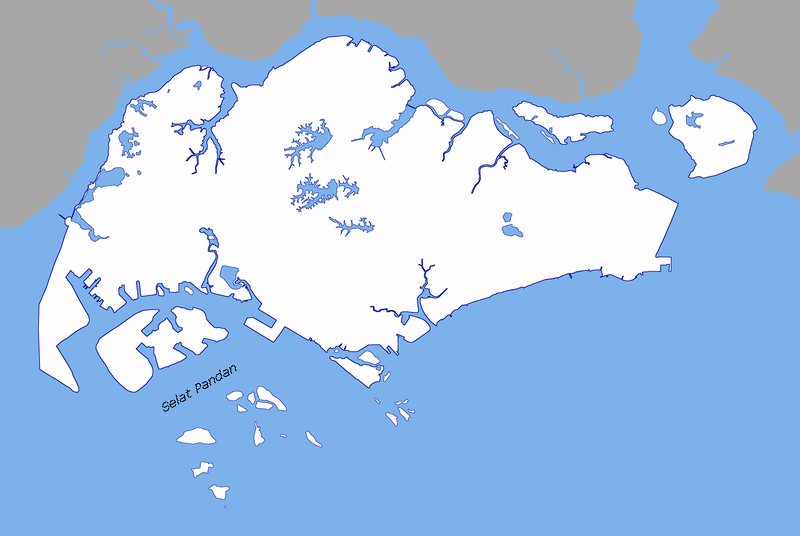

The Pandan Strait is a strait south of Singapore's main island. It separates the man-made Jurong Island from the Southern Islands. It has a depth of approximately 15 m (49 ft). The strait was partially affected by the Natuna Sea oil spill in October 2000.

== See also ==
- Singapore Strait
