= Thow Kwang Pottery Jungle =

Pottery farm in Singapore

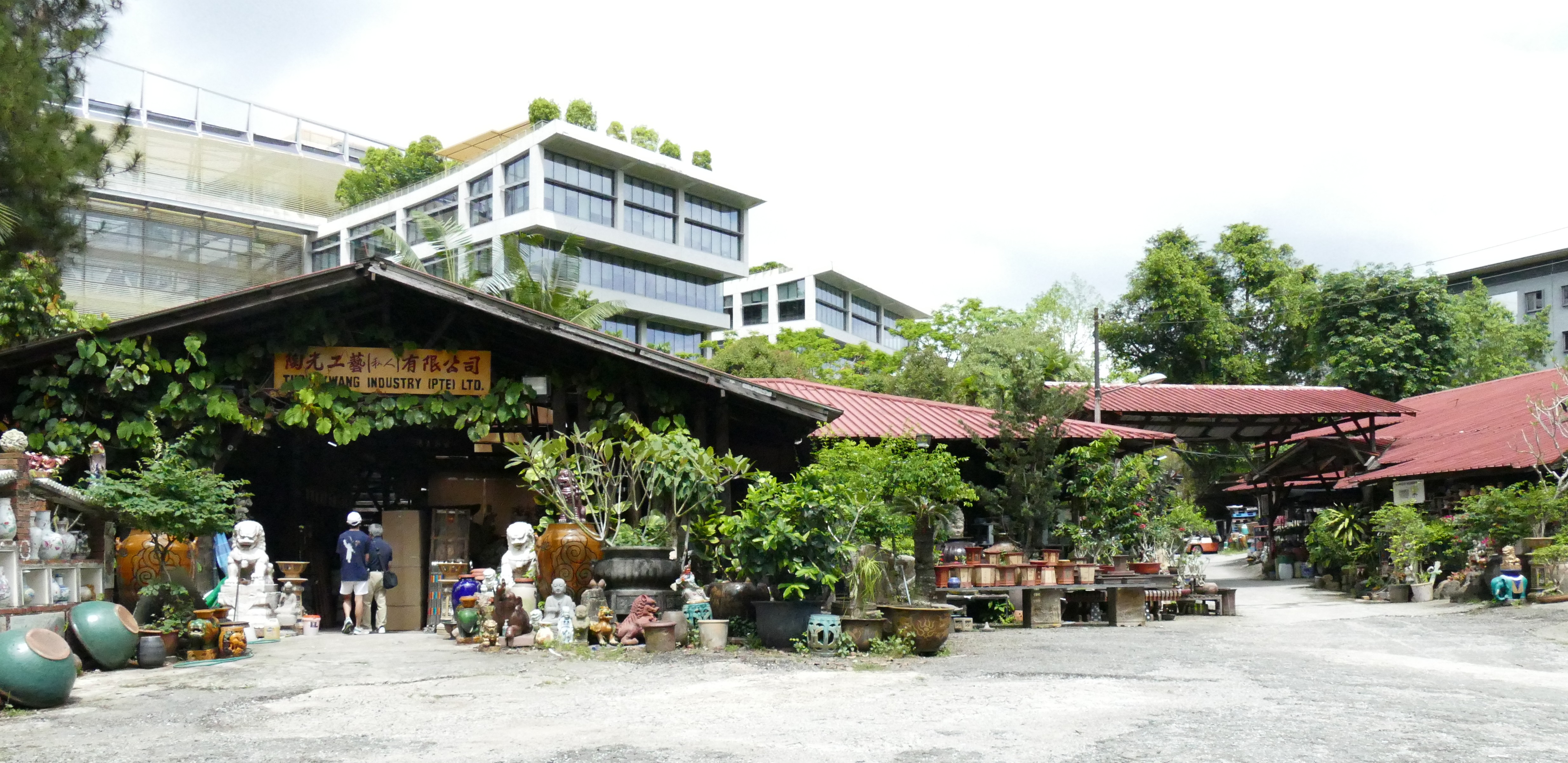
- Front entrance of Thow Kwang Pottery Jungle
- Industry: Pottery, Education
- Founded: 1965
- Founder: Tan Kim Seh
- Key people: Tan Kim Seh, Tan Teck Yoke, Yulianti Tan, Stella Tan
- Website: https://thowkwang.com.sg/

The Thow Kwang Pottery Jungle (Chinese: 陶光龍窯; Pe̍h-ūe-jī:Thâu-kuang Lêng-iê; Peng'im: Tao^{5}guang^{1} Lêng^{5}iê^{5}; also known as Thow Kwang Industry Pte Ltd) is a pottery farm located in the Western Water Catchment region of Singapore. It consists of a traditional wood-fired dragon kiln and a retail shop for stoneware. The dragon kiln was built in the 1940s, and the site itself was established by Tan Kim Seh (Chinese: 陈钦赐; Pe̍h-ūe-jī:Tâng Khim-sṳ̀; Peng'im: Dang^{5} Kim^{1}se^{3}) in 1965, who himself came from a village in Shatow, China that made pottery. It is the oldest dragon kiln in Singapore and the only one still operational, albeit only a few times a year.

The Thow Kwang Pottery Jungle offers various activities, including pottery-making workshops for both children and adults. Alongside importing and exporting pottery, it features a vast collection of ceramic wares, ranging from antique vases to contemporary designs. In 2020, Thow Kwang Pottery Jungle received the National Heritage Board's "The Stewards of Singapore's Intangible Cultural Heritage Award" for its role in preserving traditional practices.

== History ==
=== Origin in Singapore ===
The dragon kiln itself was constructed by Teochew and Hokkien immigrants in the 1940s. The kiln is 27 meters long, starting at 0.8 meters height at its front and 1.97 meters at its back end. It has a width of 0.77 meters at the front, widening to 2 meters at the end. It was constructed out of bricks and clay on an elongated, sloped surface. The kiln has seventeen stokeholes that are used to feed the fire.

Clay for the kiln was extracted from an area nearby, which resulted in the formation of a pond after significant excavation took place.

=== Changing Demands ===
Tan Kim Seh bought over the site in 1965. Their initial business consisted of producing latex cups, similar to most other pottery farms in Singapore, due to demand from rubber plantations in Malaysia. In the 1980s, Singapore's shift in burial practices to cremation led to a rise in demand for burial urns, leading the farm to take up production.

In the 1980s, Tan's son, Tan Teck Yoke (Chinese: 陈德育; Pe̍h-ūe-jī:Tâng Tek-io̍k; Peng'im: Dang^{5} Dêg^{4}iog^{8}), took over the business alongside his wife Yulianti due to his father's age and illness. In the 1990s, the younger Tan began importing and exporting pottery from Southeast Asian countries to supplement the loss in demand for production goods. Reform and opening up in the 1990s allowed them to return to China, importing pottery from their hometown of Fengxi as well as other villages.

In the 2000s, the farm began to work with educational institutes in Singapore, providing tours and pottery lessons for students. Tan's daughter, Stella, began implementing more digitized practices in the 2010s to appeal to Singapore's urban clientele.

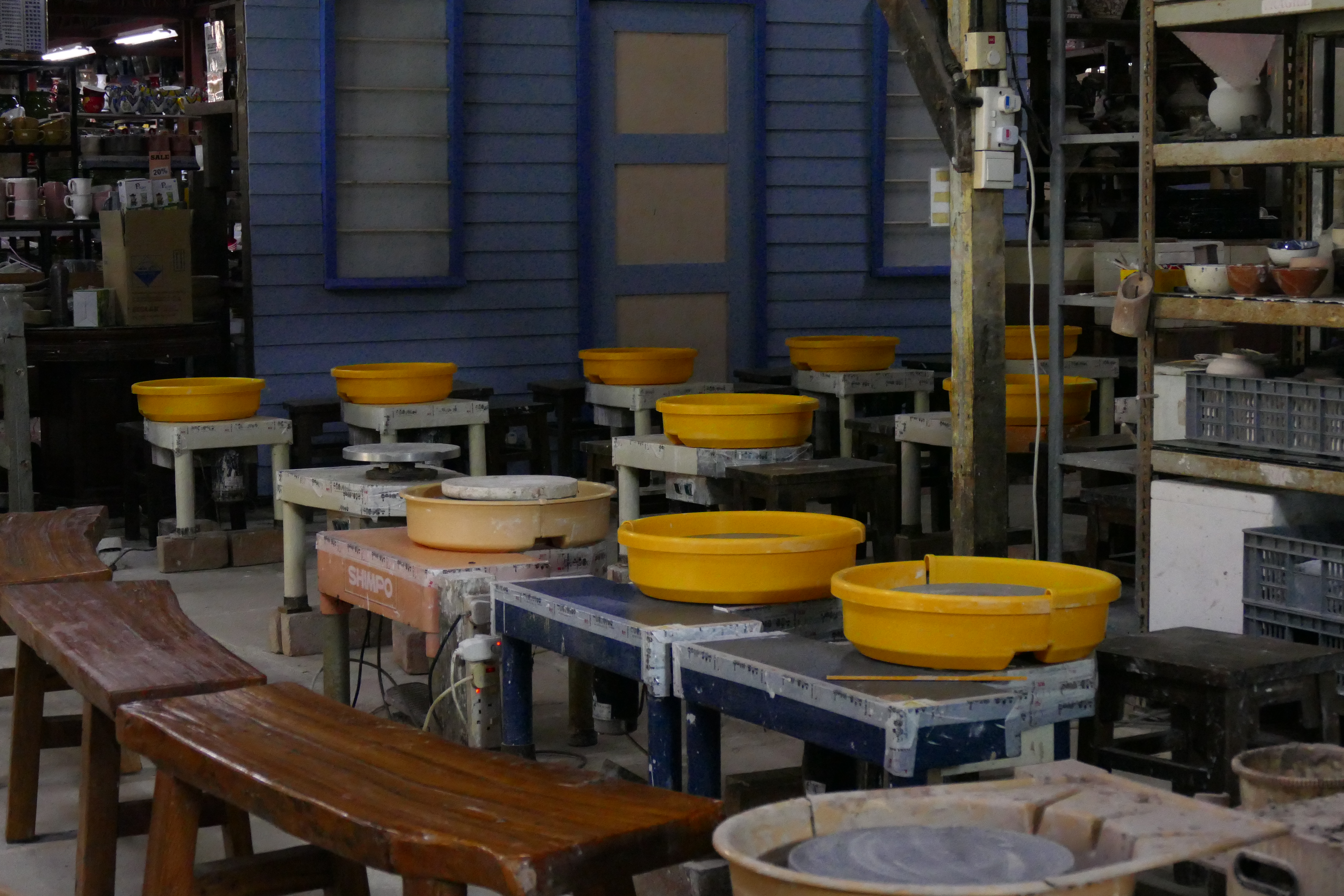
An area in one of the buildings for visitors to make their own clayworks.

=== COVID-19 ===
The pottery farm made use of its digitized practices to appeal to customers during the COVID-19 pandemic, which saw the implementation of quarantine measures by the Singapore government. During this period, Thow Kwang publicized their 'Mini Wheel' set for purchase, which enabled the farm's students to continue their pottery at home.

=== Cultural Heritage Award ===
In October 2019, the National Heritage Board in Singapore launched the 'Stewards of Singapore's Intangible Cultural Heritage Award', to recognize efforts in preserving cultural practices. Nominees for the award had to have demonstrated 'active transmission of skills and knowledge' as well as 'long-term dedication to transmitting practice'. In 2020, Thow Kwang Pottery Jungle was one of six recipients of the award.

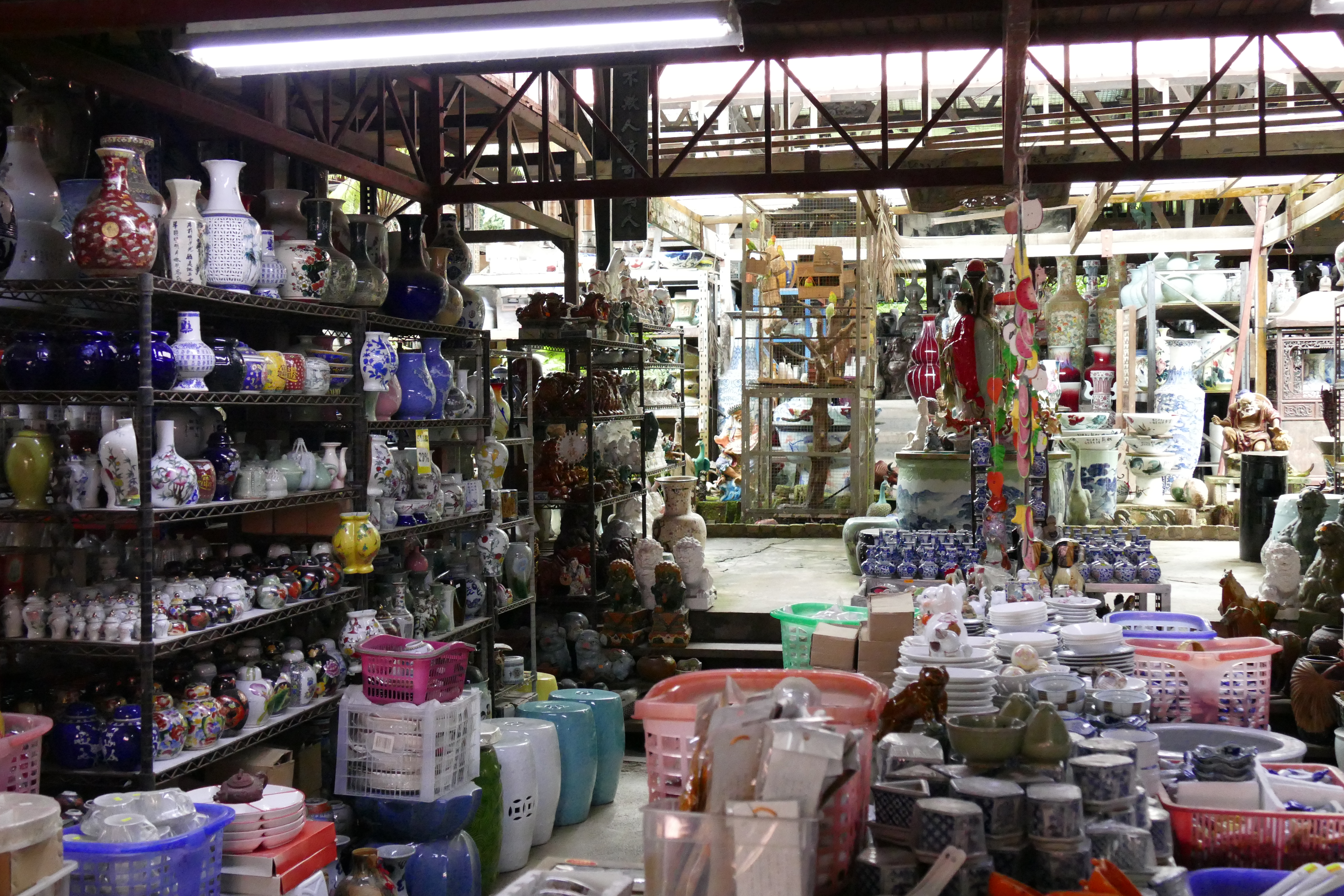
Pottery for retail sale inside Thow Kwang Pottery Jungle.

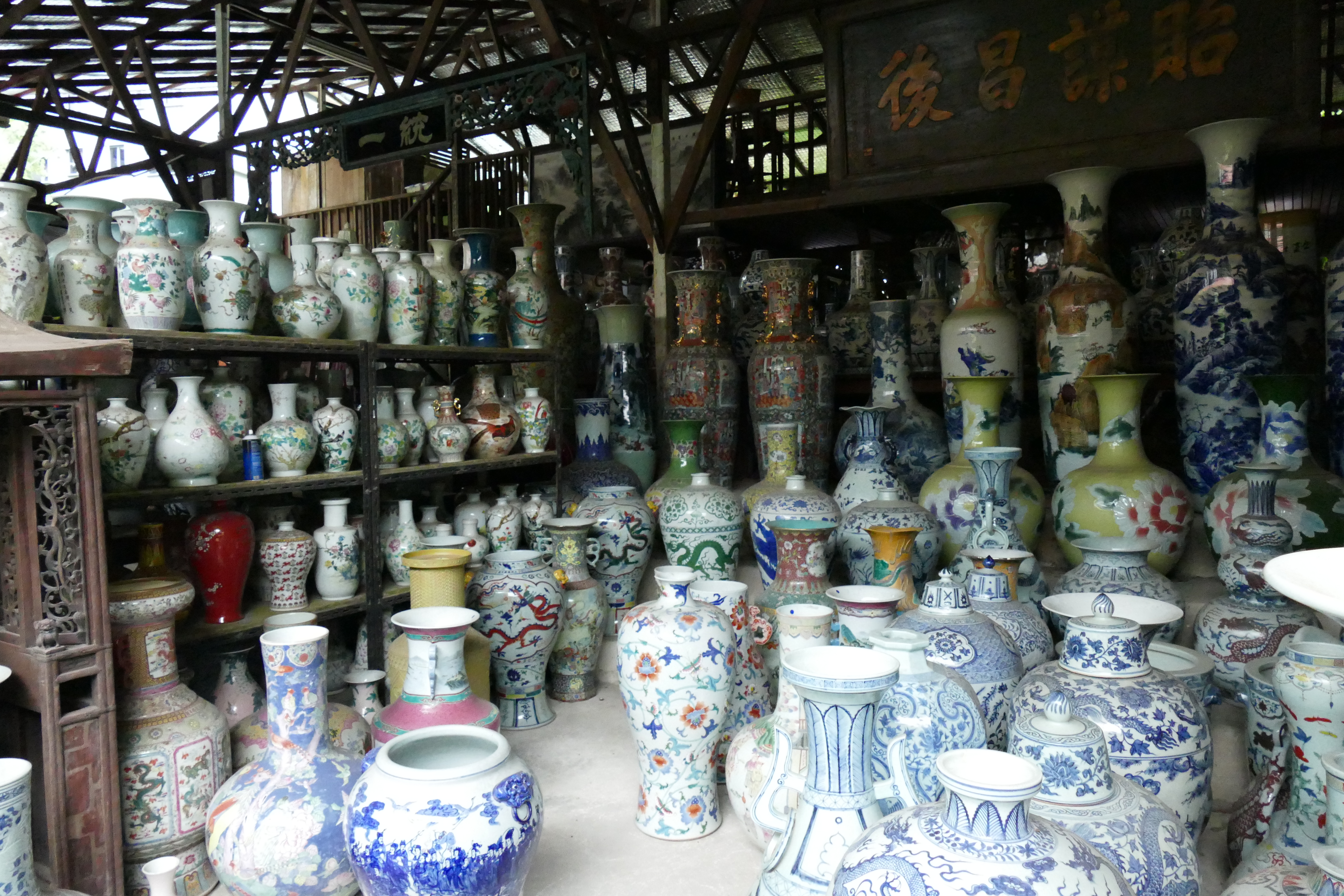
Pottery for retail sale inside Thow Kwang Pottery Jungle.

== 'Awaken the Dragon' festival ==
In 2012, a plan to raise awareness about the historical arts in Singapore was put together by a group of artists and partially funded by the National Arts Council. Multiple workshops conducted at homes and cafes allowed attendees to make their own clay objects, all of which were collectively fired together at Thow Kwang's dragon kiln. The completed works were then placed on display at the National Museum of Singapore. The festival was credited with helping to conserve the location from redevelopment as part of the Population White Paper in 2013.

== Kiln Firing ==
Before firing the kiln, the kiln operators would offer prayers to an altar box above the firing box.

During its initial years since 1965, the kiln would be fired up to four times a month due to production demands for the latex cups. The materials would be fired for up to 24 hours before being left to cool for a week. The positioning of ceramics within the kiln can affect the texture and color of the produced wares. Skilled operators of the kiln were able to visually discern the temperature of the kiln by the color of the flame, though modern sensors are able to measure the flame in the kiln as reaching highs of 1,260 degrees celsius.

Clay pieces and works would be arranged on shelves within the kiln, with cockle shells being used to prevent the clay from fusing to the shelves. Wood is manually fed into the kiln via the stokeholes.

Presently, the dragon kiln is fired only a few times a year on special occasions. The whole process can take 30 – 40 hours.

== Pottery Workshops ==
The pottery farm offers workshops for children and adults, ranging from one-off pottery sessions to corporate bonding events.
