= Singapore Discovery Centre =

Tourist attraction in Singapore

- Front entrance in 2026
- Established: 23 November 1996; 29 years ago
- Location: 510 Upper Jurong Road, Singapore 638365
- Public transit access: EW29 Joo Koon
- Website: defencecollectivesg.com/singapore-discovery-centre/

The Singapore Discovery Centre (SDC) is an 'edutainment' and tourist attraction by the Ministry of Defence of Singapore in Jurong West, Singapore. The centre includes exhibits which display the history of Singapore as well as an insight on the future.

== History ==
In 1992, Heritage Technology Exhibition, a member of the Singapore Technologies Group, announced to build a centre to show Singapore's success. The centre was projected to cost SGD30 million and to be built within SAFTI Military Institute in Jurong. The center will have 10,000 square meters of exhibition space.

SDC was opened on 24 October 1996. The centre was built beside SAFTI Military Institute at a cost of SGD70 million. It was officially opened on 23 November 1996.

SDC closed for redevelopment from November 2004 to June 2006. The centre reopened on 18 July 2006 by then Minister for Defence, Mr Teo Chee Hean.

In early 2024, the museum was reported as being the first energy positive museum in Singapore after generating about 30 percent more energy than it needed from October 2023 to February 2024.

== Exhibits ==
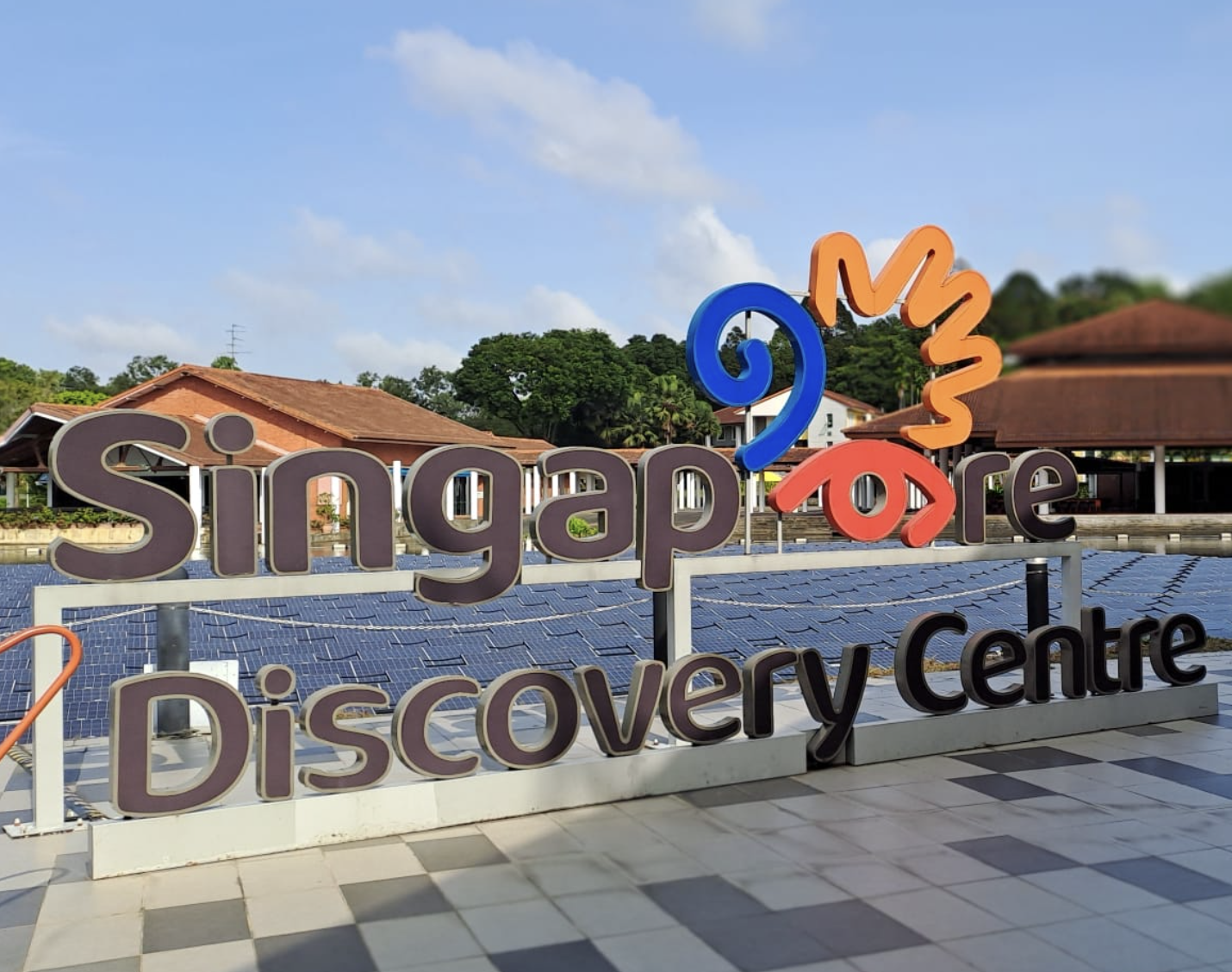
Sign at Singapore Discovery Centre, 2024

In its first phase it developed showing Singapore's recent history - living under the flags of Britain, Japan and Malaysia before becoming an independent nation. Milestones in that journey were picked out in a theatrical setting. 'Singapore Today' showed the vibrant life in late 20th century Singapore.

Other galleries include mini-theaters showing the role of tactics and planning in everyday life and showcased the Singapore Armed Forces. Indoor exhibits include 'So Singapore Theatre, Gateway, Portals, Build it, Crisis Simulation Theatre, Harmony Circle etc.

Outdoor exhibits includes a playground and the a display of aircraft.

The Chief Exhibit Designer for the centre's creation is UK based Neal Potter. The centre was planned by Canadian company Lord Cultural Resources and the building was designed by mgt Architects from Australia.

=== Outdoor exhibits ===
The centre also has an outdoor exhibition of military hardware used by the Singapore Armed Forces. Permanent exhibits include an AMX-13 tank, UH-1H helicopter and a Skyhawk fighter jet.

== Awards and recognition ==
- Tripartite Committee on Work-Life Strategy, 2012
  - Work-Life Achiever Award 2012
- Minister for Defence Award (MiDAs), 2013
  - Inducted into the MiDAs League for a five-year tenure as advocates of national defence
- Singapore Book of Records, 2020
  - Longest Sheltered Walkway Fitted With Solar Panels
- Singapore Good Design Award (SG Mark) – Interior Design, 2021
  - Awarded for SDC’s Permanent Exhibits Gallery: Through the Lens of Time
- NS Mark (Gold), 2021
