= Joo Koon Bus Interchange =

Transportation Facility in Singapore

Joo Koon Bus Interchange 裕群巴士转换站 Pusat Pertukaran Bas Joo Koon
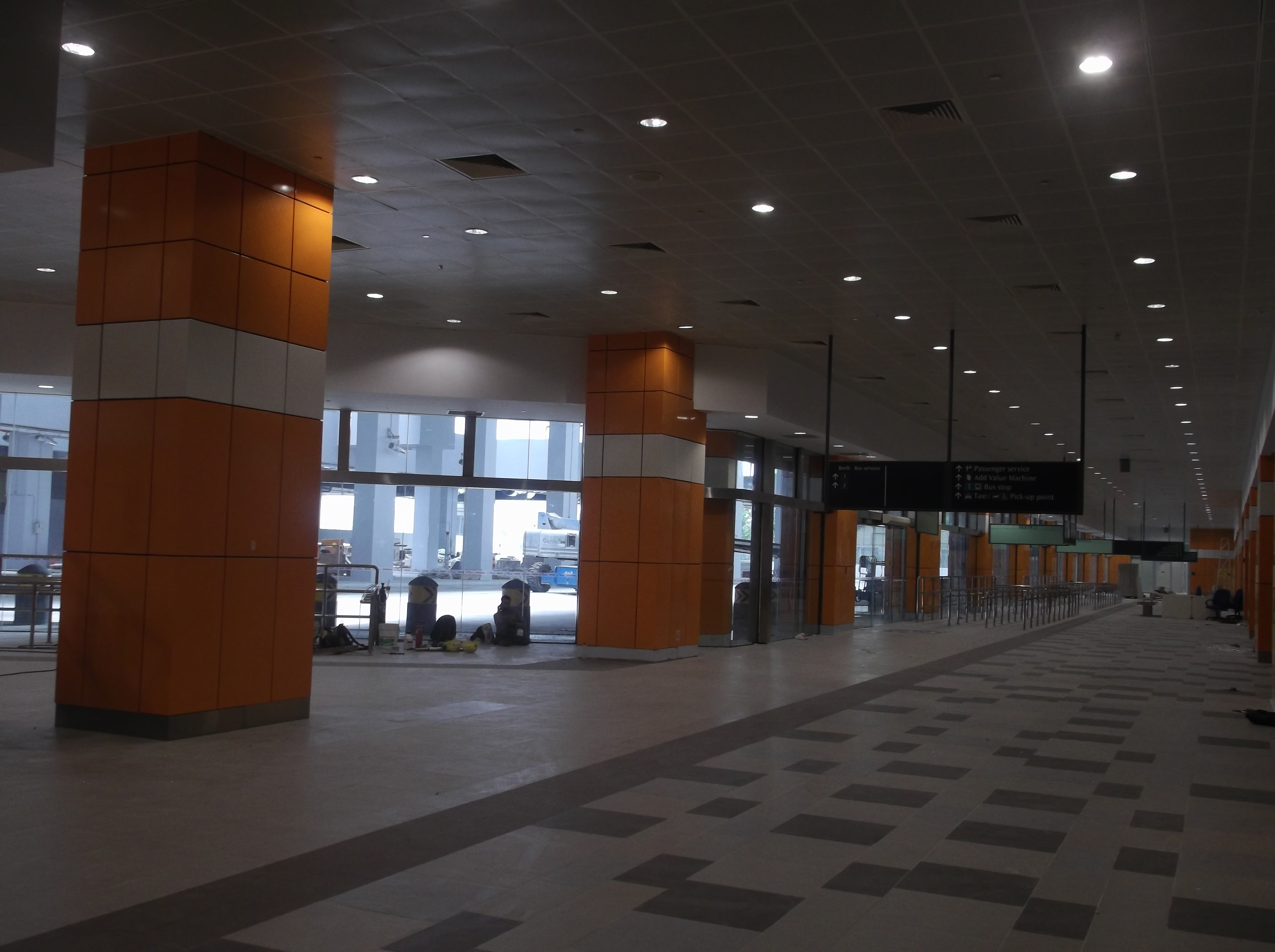
- The concourse of Joo Koon Bus Interchange.

General information
- Location: 55 Benoi Road, Singapore 629907
- System: Public Bus Interchange
- Owner: Land Transport Authority
- Operator: SMRT Buses
- Bus routes: 9 (SMRT Buses); 1 (SBS Transit)
- Bus stands: 3 Boarding Berths; 2 Alighting Berths
- Bus operators: SMRT Buses; SBS Transit
- Connections: EW29 Joo Koon

Construction
- Structure type: At-grade
- Accessible: Accessible alighting/boarding points Accessible public toilets Graduated kerb edges Tactile guidance system

History
- Opened: 21 November 2015; 10 years ago

Key dates
- 21 November 2015: Commenced operations
- 15 September 2024: Operations transferred to SMRT Buses under the Jurong West Bus Package
Location

Joo Koon Bus Interchange is an air-conditioned bus interchange located along Joo Koon Circle and Benoi Road, serving industrial areas around Pioneer and Tuas. It opened in November 2015. It is the eighth air-conditioned bus interchange in Singapore, integrated within the retail segment of the NTUC FairPrice's FairPrice Hub mixed development, and directly connected to Joo Koon MRT station. Nearby public amenities include the Singapore Discovery Centre, Army Museum of Singapore, Kartright Speedway and Arena Country Club.

== History ==
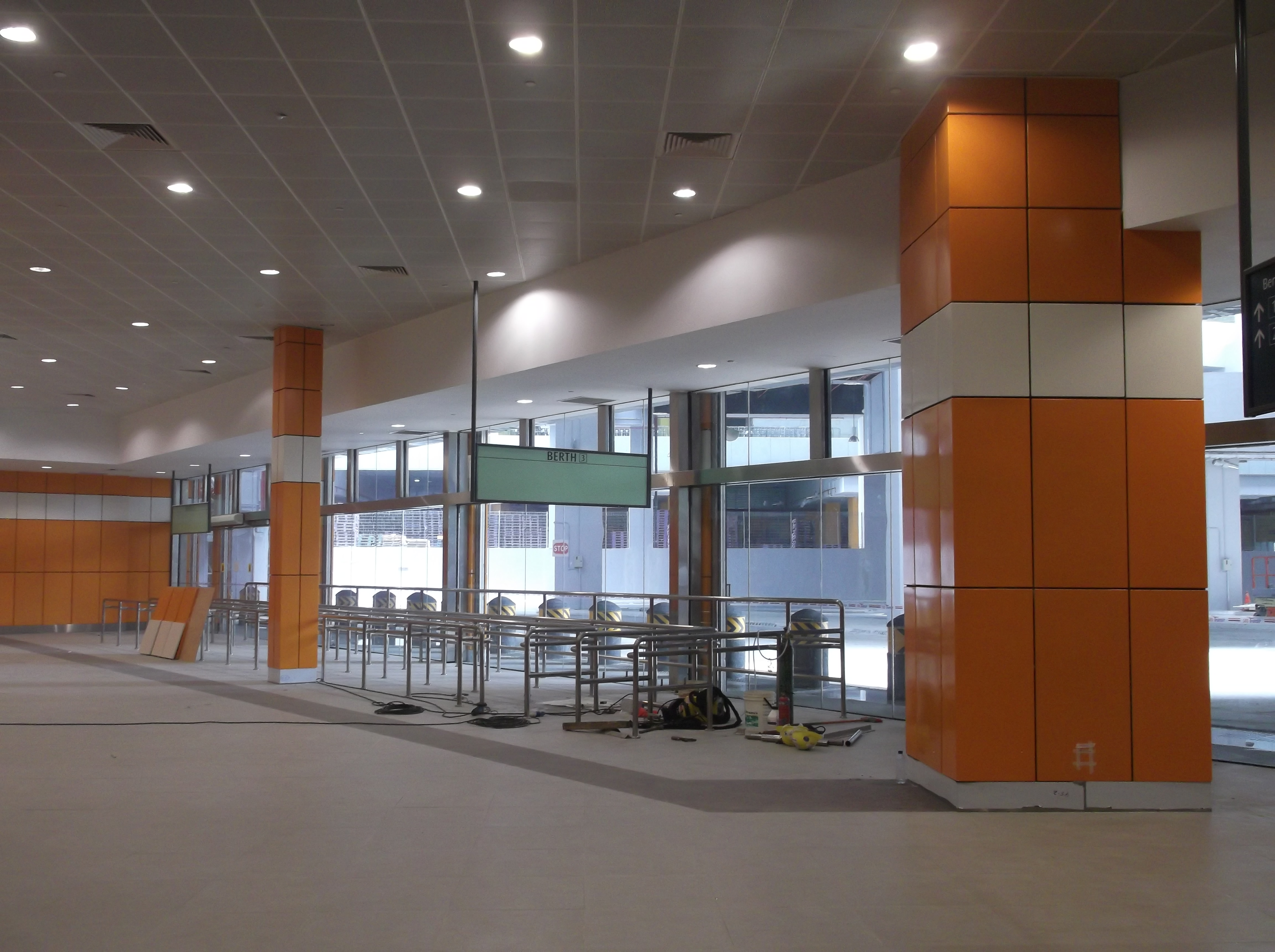
Sawtooth Berth 3

The interchange was first announced in 2006, together with the extension of the East–West line to Joo Koon. It was meant to improve accessibility to the Tuas area as well as reduce overcrowding at the Boon Lay Bus Interchange.

The interchange commenced operations on 21 November 2015, and it was opened in three phases to reduce inconvenience to commuters. It was the 8th bus interchange in Singapore to be air-conditioned.

== Bus contracting model ==
Under the bus contracting model, all bus services operating from Joo Koon Bus Interchange were divided into 2 Bus Packages, operated by two different bus operators.

=== List of bus services ===
| Operator | Package | Service | Berth | Destination | Remarks |
|---|---|---|---|---|---|
| SBS Transit | Clementi | 99 | B3 | Clementi | —N/a |
| SMRT Buses | Jurong West | 182 | B3 | ↺ Tuas South Avenue 9 | —N/a |
| SMRT Buses | Jurong West | 182M | B3 | ↺ Tuas South Avenue 9 | —N/a |
| SMRT Buses | Jurong West | 253 | B2 | ↺ Benoi Road | —N/a |
| SMRT Buses | Jurong West | 254 | B1 | ↺ Tuas Avenue 11 | —N/a |
| SMRT Buses | Jurong West | 255 | B1 | ↺ Gul Crescent | —N/a |
| SMRT Buses | Jurong West | 257 | B2 | ↺ Pioneer Sector 2 | —N/a |
| SMRT Buses | Jurong West | 258 | B1 | ↺ Jurong West Street 64 | —N/a |
| SMRT Buses | Jurong West | 258M | B1 | ↺ Boon Lay Place | Weekends / Public holidays |
| SMRT Buses | Jurong West | 974 | B2 | ↺ Upper Bukit Timah Road | —N/a |
| SMRT Buses | Jurong West | 974A | B2 | Choa Chu Kang Avenue 4 (Lot 1/Choa Chu Kang Station) | Short trip service |
