= Fuhua =

Fuhua may refer to:

- Fuhua Primary School in Jurong East, Singapore
- Fuhua Secondary School in Jurong West, Singapore
