= Penjuru Crescent =

- Subzone of Jurong East Planning Area

Name transcription(s)
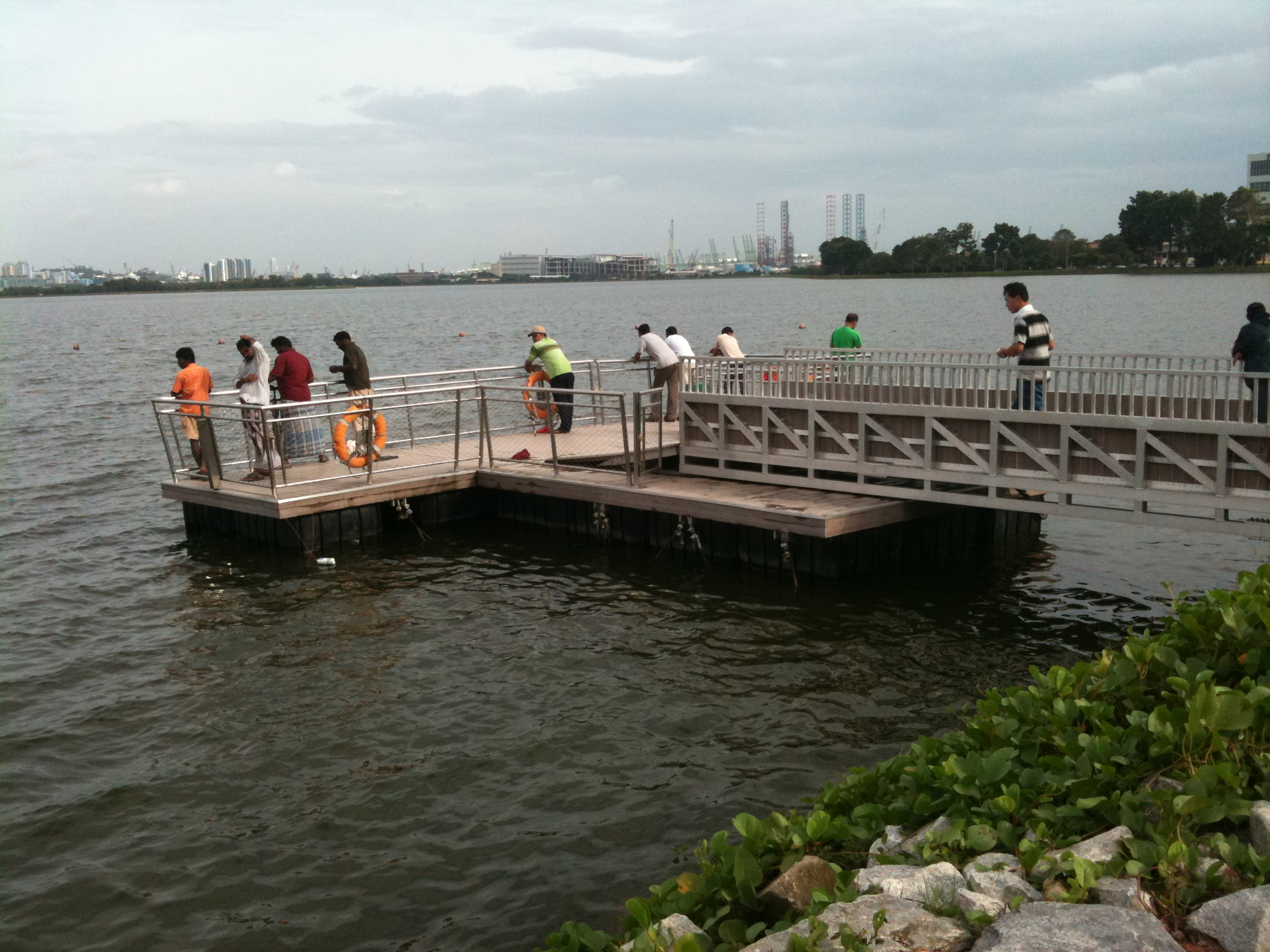
- Pandan Reservoir Fishing Jetty on Penjuru Road
- Interactive map of Penjuru Crescent
- Coordinates: 1.30383°N 103.74036°E
- Country: Singapore

Population (2020)
  - Total: 10

Penjuru Crescent is an industrial area and subzone in Jurong East, Singapore. It is bounded by Sungei Jurong, Ayer Rajah Expressway, Penjuru Road, Jalan Buroh, Sungei Pandan, West Coast Highway and West Coast Park, on the peninsula of Tanjong Penjuru. Penjuru Crescent consists of mostly heavy industries and the first two railroad crossings of the Jurong Line.

== Etymology ==
Penjuru is the Malay word for corner.

== History ==
The area was formerly known as Tanjong Penjuru which referred to the area in between Sungei Jurong and Sungei Pandan. Several fires have occurred at the factories in the area.

On 13 March 1975, a fire occurred at the Dreamland Timber Company in Jalan Tanjong Penjulu. Part of a furnace and some sawdust caught fire. The flames were extinguished after the fire brigade arrived and no injuries occurred from the fire.

On 22 May 1978, a fire occurred at Kansal United Paints Pte. Ltd. in Tanjong Penjuru following 2 explosions. It resulted in the destruction of the paint factory and most of the factory's combustible stock which totalled about S$3 million.

On 23 February 1983, two men were killed when a fire broke out after an explosion occurred at the Caltex storage terminal in Tanjong Penjulu. Their bodies were initially unable to be identified due to how badly burnt the bodies were. The men were carrying out welding work at the time.

== Public transit ==
It is accessible through Tower Transit bus services 78, 79, 285 and SMRT bus service 176 at the southern border although SBS Transit and Tower Transit bus services 30, 51, 143 and 533 are found near the northern border.
