= Port of Singapore =

Port in Singapore

Port of Singapore Pelabuhan Singapura 新加坡港 சிங்கப்பூர் துறைமுகம்
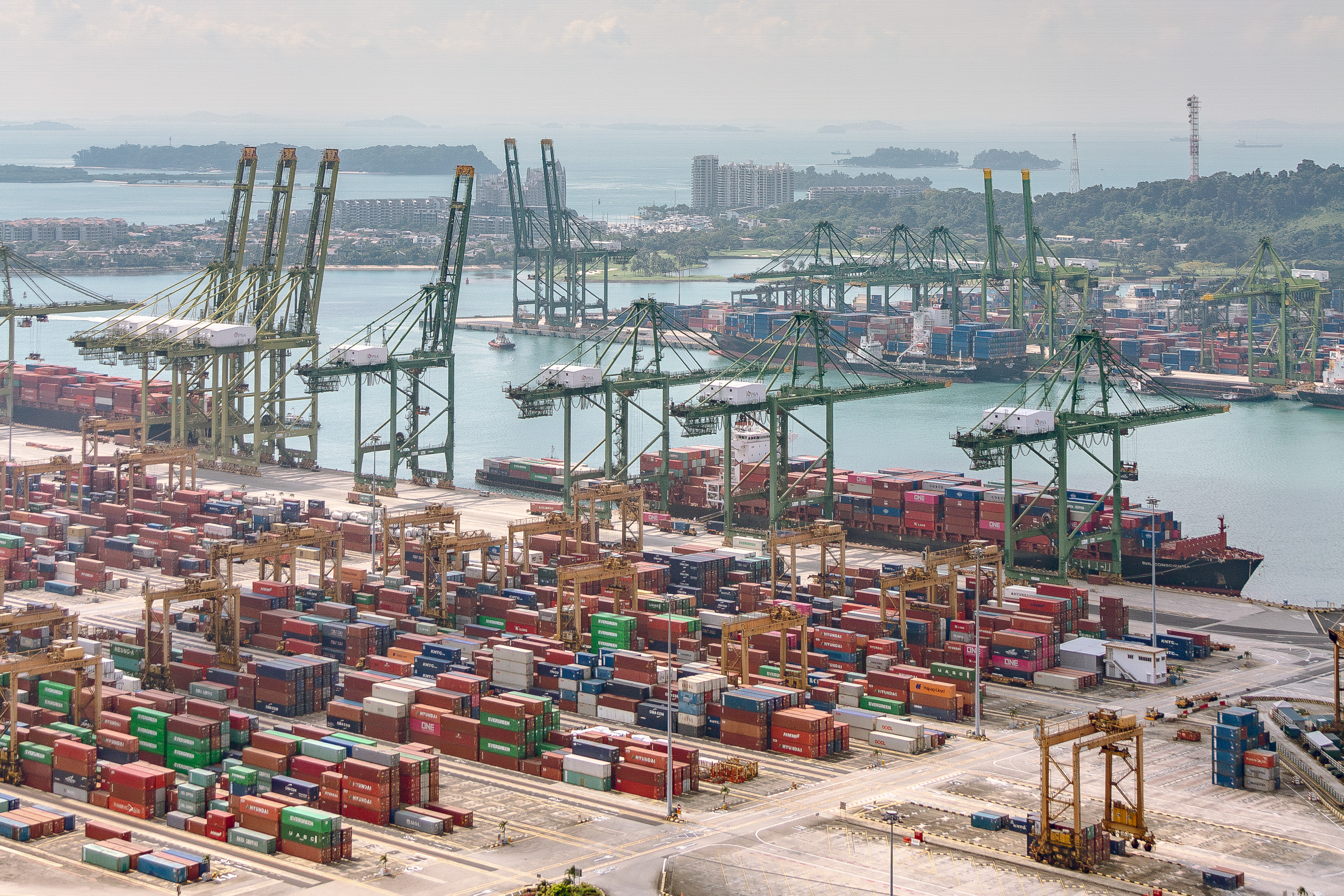
- Port of Singapore
- Interactive map of Port of Singapore; Pelabuhan Singapura 新加坡港 சிங்கப்பூர் துறைமுகம்
- Location within Singapore

Location
- Location: Pasir Panjang, Singapore
- Coordinates: 1.264°N 103.840°E

Details
- Built: 1819 (contemporary version)
- Operated by: PSA International; Jurong Port
- Owned by: Maritime and Port Authority of Singapore
- No. of berths: 67 (2019)
- Street access: Ayer Rajah Expressway

Statistics
- Annual TEU: 44.66 million (2025)
- Website https://www.mpa.gov.sg

The Port of Singapore is a collection of facilities and terminals that conduct maritime trade and handle Singapore's harbours and shipping. Since 2015, it has been ranked as the world's top maritime capital. Currently, it is ranked as the world's second-busiest port in terms of total shipping tonnage, while also transshipping a fifth of the world's shipping containers, and half of the world's annual crude oil supplies, alongside being ranked as the world's busiest transshipment port. Furthermore, it was also ranked as the world's busiest port in terms of total cargo tonnage handled until 2010, when it was surpassed by the Port of Shanghai.

Due to the city-state's strategic location, Singapore has served as a significant entrepôt and trading post on an international level for at least two centuries. During the contemporary era, its ports have been regarded not merely as an economic boon for the country, but as vitally important for the country's economic development since Singapore lacks land and natural resources. Additionally, the port is regarded as particularly important for importing natural resources, and then later re-exporting products after they have been domestically refined and shaped in some manner, for example, wafer fabrication or oil refining to generate value-added revenue. The Port of Singapore is also the world's largest bunkering port. Moreover, the majority of ships that pass between the Indian Ocean and the Pacific Ocean go through the Singapore Strait. The Straits of Johor on the country's north are impassable for ships due to the Johor-Singapore Causeway, built in 1923, which links the town of Woodlands, Singapore, to the city of Johor Bahru in Malaysia.

== History ==
=== Before 1819 ===
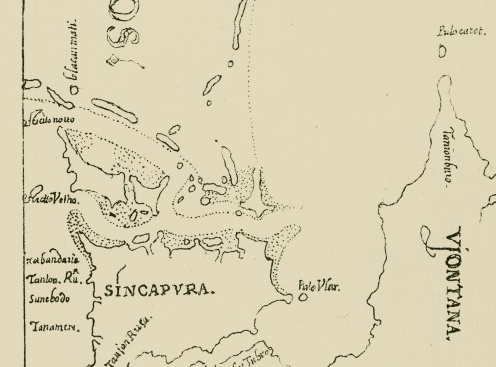
Xabandaria (the Shahbandar's place) marked in this 1604 map of Singapore by Godinho de Erédia. The map is orientated with the South towards the top left.

In the late 13th century, a Kingdom known as Singapura was established on the north bank of the Singapore River around what was called the Old Harbour. It was the only port in the southern part of the Strait of Malacca, servicing ships and traders in the region, competing with other ports along the coast of the Malacca Strait such as Jambi, Kota Cina, Lambri, Semudra, Palembang, South Kedah, and Tamiang. The port had two functions. First, it made available products that were in demand by international markets; according to the Daoyi Zhilüe (Brief Annals of Foreign Islands, 1349) by Chinese trader Wang Dayuan (born 1311, fl. 1328–1339), these included top-quality hornbill casques, lakawood, and cotton. Although these goods were also available from other Southeast Asian ports, those from Singapore were regarded as unique in terms of their quality. Secondly, Singapore acted as a gateway into the regional and international economic system for its immediate region. South Johor and the Riau Archipelago supplied products to Singapore for export elsewhere, while Singapore was the major source of foreign products that were imported to the region. Archaeological artefacts, such as ceramics and glassware, discovered in the Riau Archipelago confirm this. Additionally, cotton was transshipped from Java or India through Singapore.

In 1984, an archaeological excavation began at Fort Canning Hill, led by the archaeologist Dr John Miksic. Eventually, a wide range of artefacts, including earthenware, ceramic, and porcelain pieces, were discovered, serving as evidence of Singapore's role as an active international trading port in the 14th century.

By the 15th century, Singapore had declined as an international trading port due to the ascendance of the Malacca Sultanate. Local trade continued on the island. A map of Singapore by Portuguese mathematician Manuel Godinho de Eredia showed the location of Xabandaria or the office of a shahbandar, the Malay official responsible for international trade. Shards of 15th-century Siam ceramics and late 16th – or early 17th-century Chinese blue and white porcelain have been found at the Singapore and Kallang Rivers. Singapore also supplied other regional ports with local products demanded by international markets. For instance, blackwood (a generic term used by Europeans to refer to rosewood) was exported from Singapore to Malacca, and was in turn purchased by Chinese traders and shipped to China for furniture-making:)

In the early 17th century, Singapore's main settlement and its port were destroyed by a punitive force from Aceh. After this incident, there was no significant settlement or port at Singapore until 1819.

=== 1819–1960 ===
Port at Singapore, ca. 1890

In 1819, Stamford Raffles, a British colonial official, excited by the deep and sheltered waters in Keppel Harbour, established for the British Empire a new settlement and international trading port on the island. Keen to attract Asian and European traders to the new port, Raffles directed that land along the banks of the Singapore River, particularly the south bank, be reclaimed where necessary and allocated to Chinese and English country traders to encourage them to establish a stake in the port settlement. As a consequence of their frequent commercial interactions with Southeast Asian traders throughout the year, Chinese traders established their trading houses along the lower reaches of the river, while English country traders, who depended on the annual arrival of trade from India, set up warehouses along the upper reaches. The port relied on three main networks of trade that existed in Southeast Asia at that time: the Chinese network, which linked Southeast Asia with the southern Chinese ports of Fujian and Guangdong; the Southeast Asian network, which linked the islands of the Indonesian archipelago; and the European and Indian Ocean network, which linked Singapore to the markets of Europe and the Indian Ocean littoral. These networks were complementary, and positioned Singapore as the transshipment point of regional and international trade. By the 1830s, Singapore had overtaken Batavia (now Jakarta) as the centre of the Chinese junk trade, while it also became the centre of English country trade in Southeast Asia. This was because Southeast Asian traders preferred the free port of Singapore to other major regional ports, which had cumbersome restrictions. Singapore had also supplanted Tanjung Pinang as the export gateway for the gambier and pepper industry of the Riau–Lingga Archipelago by the 1830s, and South Johor by the 1840s. Additionally, it had also become the centre of the Teochew trade in marine produce and rice.

As the volume of its maritime trade increased in the 19th century, Singapore became a key port of call for sailing and steam vessels in their passage along Asian sea routes. From the 1840s, Singapore became an important coaling station for steam shipping networks that were beginning to form. Towards the late 19th century, Singapore developed into a staple port servicing the geographical hinterland of the Malay Peninsula. Following the institution of the British Forward Movement, Singapore became the administrative capital of British Malaya. Roads and railways were developed to transport primary materials such as crude oil, rubber and tin from the Malay Peninsula to Singapore to be processed into staple products, and then shipped to Britain and other international markets. During the colonial period, this was considered the most significant role of the port of Singapore.

=== 1963–2021 ===
Singapore ceased to be part of the British Empire when it merged with Malaysia in 1963. Singapore lost its hinterland and was no longer the administrative or economic capital of the Malay Peninsula. The processing of raw materials extracted from the Peninsula in Singapore was significantly reduced due to the lack of a common market between Singapore and the Peninsular states.

Since Singapore's full independence in 1965, it has sought an edge to compete with other regional ports to attract shipping and trade to its port. It has succeeded in doing so by developing an export-oriented economy based on value-added manufacturing. It obtains raw or partially manufactured products from regional and global markets and exports value-added products back to these markets through market access agreements such as World Trade Organization directives and free trade agreements.

By the 1980s, maritime trading activity had ceased in the vicinity of the Singapore River except in the form of passenger transport, as other terminals and harbours took over this role. Keppel Harbour is now home to three container terminals. Other terminals were constructed in Jurong and Pasir Panjang, as well as in Sembawang in the north. Today, the port operations in Singapore are handled by two service contractors: PSA International (formerly the Port of Singapore Authority) and Jurong Port, which collectively operate six container terminals and three general-purpose terminals around Singapore.

In the 1990s, the port became more well-known and overtook Yokohama, and eventually became the busiest port in terms of shipping tonnage.

Singapore is part of the Maritime Silk Road that runs from the Chinese coast to the southern tip of India, to Mombasa, from there through the Red Sea via the Suez Canal to the Mediterranean, to the Upper Adriatic region of the northern Italian hub Trieste with its rail connections to Central Europe and the North Sea.

=== Since 2022 ===
The Tuas mega port is planned to be the only port in Singapore after the closure of PSA city terminals and Pasir Panjang Terminal in 2027 and 2040, respectively, ending an era of port operations in the city area which began in 1819. The Sea Transport Industry Transformation Map (ITM) launched by the Maritime and Port Authority of Singapore (MPA) aims to increase the value-added industries by $4.5 billion and create more than 5,000 new jobs by 2025.

Automation would be a key part of the new port, with over 1,000 battery-powered driverless vehicles and a fleet of almost 1,000 automated yard cranes to be developed for the port. Nelson Quek, PSA Singapore's head of Tuas planning, stated that "Tuas, when it's fully developed, is going to be the single largest fully-automated terminal in the world." It will also be able to cater to the demands of the world's largest container ships, with 26 km of deep-water berths. Besides just handling containers, the port will have space set aside for companies to be located, a move that aims to improve the links between the port and businesses. It is projected to be twice the size of Ang Mo Kio's new town.

Operations at the Tuas mega port began in September 2021, and officially opened on 1 September 2022, with three berths operational. The number of operational berths increased to 11 by February 2025, 14 by August 2026, and 15 by November 2026. By 2027, a total of 18 berths will be in operation.

The second phase of the Tuas port, the largest of four phases on nearly 400 hectares (990 acres) of reclaimed land, broke ground in November 2026. It will begin operation in 2028, and to be fully completed in the mid 2030s, adding an additional 21 berths to the port.

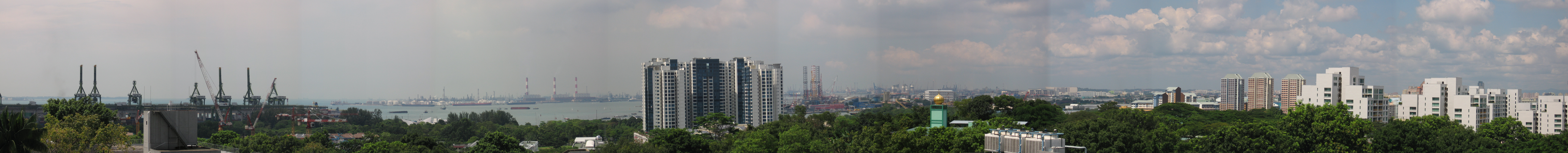
The Pasir Panjang Container Terminal lies to the left and Jurong Port in the background of this panoramic view of the southwestern part of Singapore, showing the southern parts of Queenstown, and Clementi and Jurong.

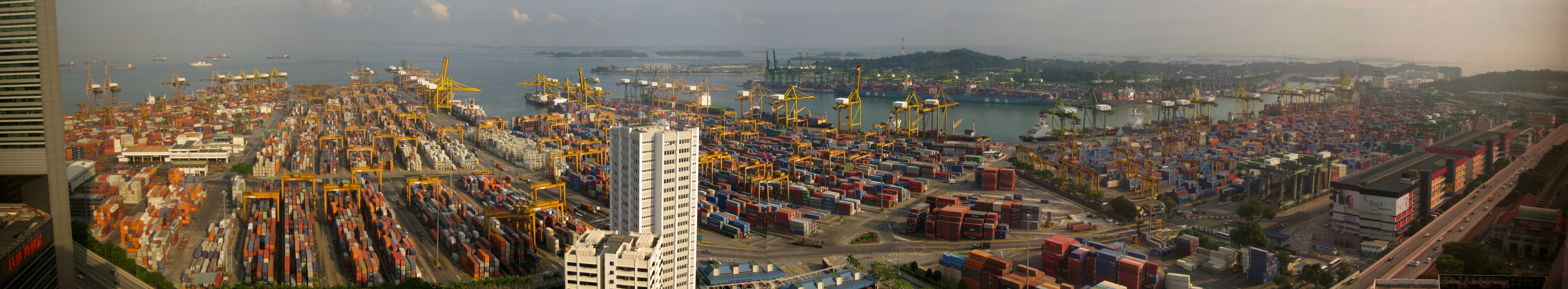
The Port of Singapore with Sentosa island in the background.

== Operations ==
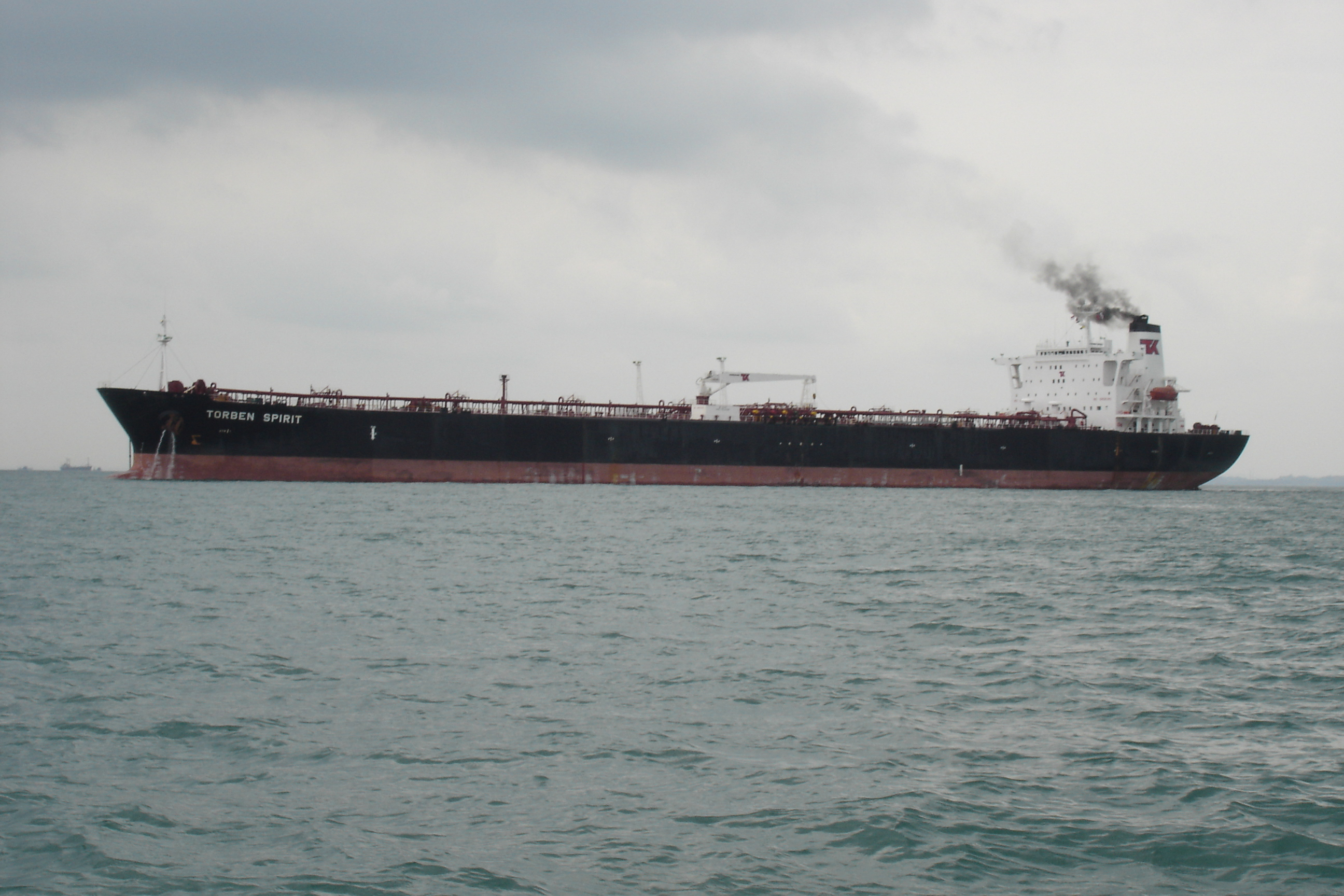
The M.T. Torben Spirit at anchor in Singapore – photographed on 6 September 2005.

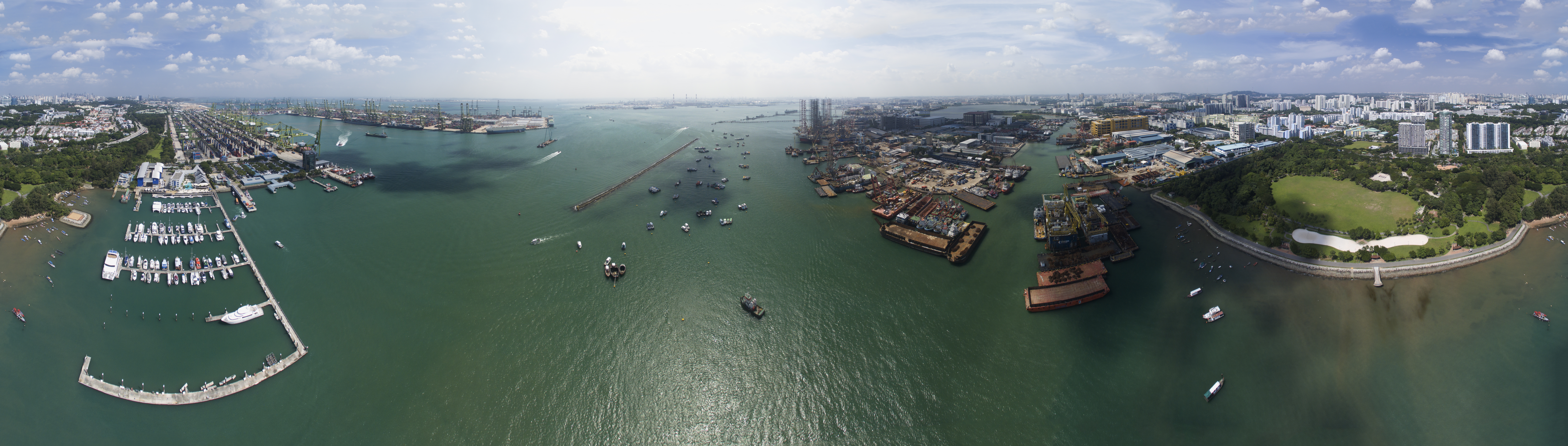
Aerial panorama of the Singapore Strait and the Pasir Panjang Port Terminal. Shot in 2016.

In 2025, the port of Singapore handled a record 3.22 billion gross tonnage of vessel arrivals and 44.66 million twenty-foot equivalent units (TEUs) of container throughput, increases of 3.5% and 8.6% from 2024, respectively. Marine fuel sales also reached 56.77 million tons, up 3.4% from the previous year.

Singapore is primarily a transshipment port and remains the world's largest bunkering hub. Around 90% of its container throughput was transshipment traffic in 2024.

Port of Singapore statistics
Year	Vessel Arrival Tonnage (billion GT)	Container Throughput (million TEUs)	Cargo Throughput (million tonnes)	Bunker Sale Volume (million tonnes)	Tonnage under Singapore Registry of Ships (million GT)
2010	1.92	28.4	503.3	40.9	48.8
2011	2.12	29.9	531.2	43.2	57.4
2012	2.25	31.6	538.0	42.7	65.0
2013	2.33	32.6	560.9	42.7	73.6
2014	2.37	33.9	581.3	42.4	82.2
2015	2.50	30.9	575.8	45.2	86.3
2016	2.66	30.9	593.3	48.6	88.0
2017	2.80	33.7	627.7	50.6	88.8
2018	2.79	36.6	630.0	49.8	90.9
2019	2.85	37.2	626.2	47.5	97.3
2020	2.90	36.9	590.7	49.8	95.0
2021	2.81	37.6	599.6	50.0	92.3
2022	2.83	37.3	578.2	47.9	95.5
2023	3.09	39.0	592.0	51.8	99.6
2024	3.11	41.1	622.9	54.9	108.0

== Operators ==
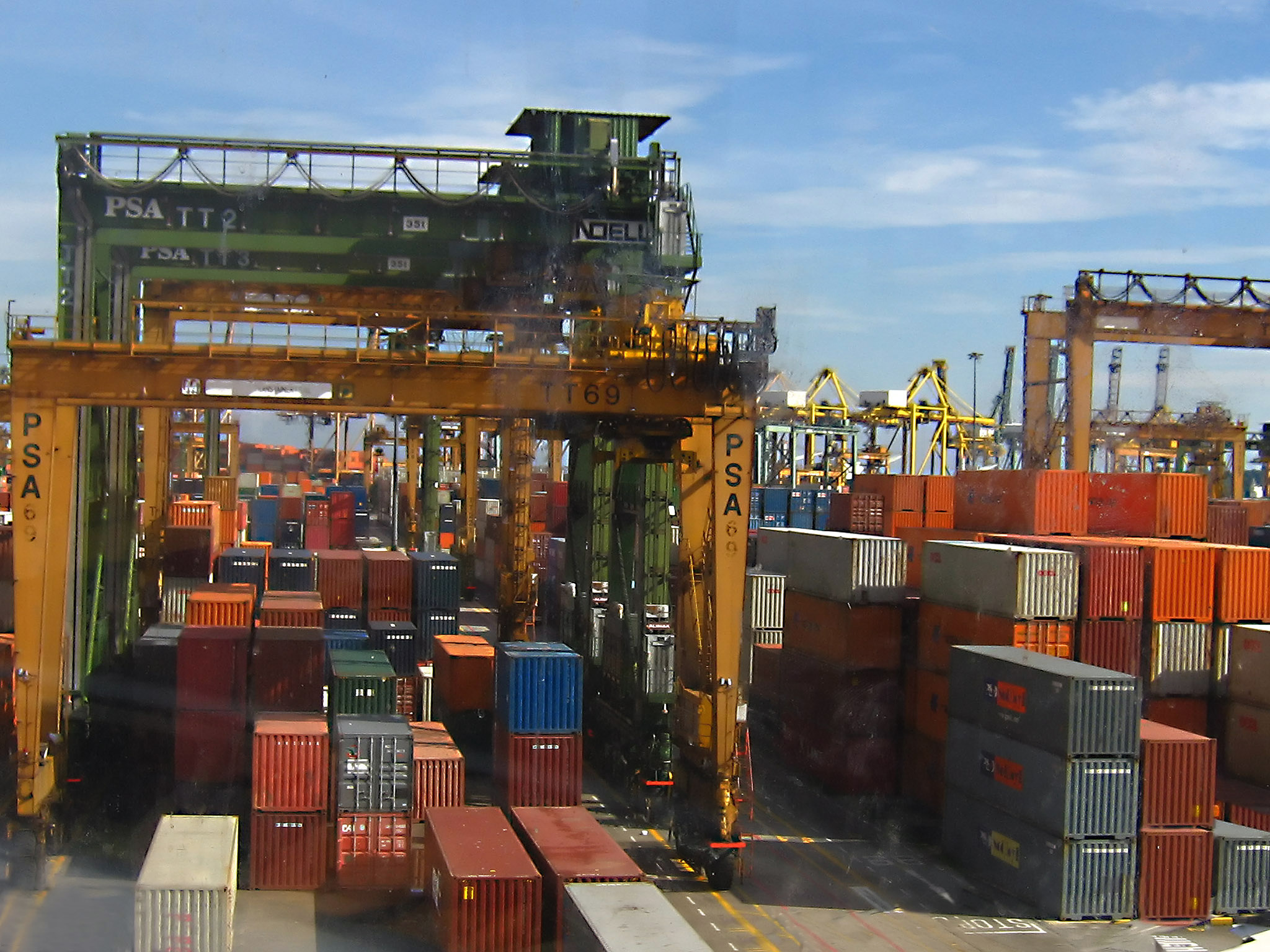
Keppel Container Terminal in Singapore

PSA Singapore's container facilities are as follows:

- Container berths: 52
- Quay length: 15,500 m
- Area: 600 hectares
- Max draft: 16 m
- Quay cranes: 190
- Designed capacity: 35,000 kTEU

PSA Singapore has 13 berths which are part of the Pasir Panjang Container Terminal's Phase Two which are due for completion by 2009. Phase Three and Four will add another 16 berths and are expected to be completed by 2013.

Jurong Port's facilities are as follows:

- Berths: 32
- Berth length: 5.6 km
- Maximum vessel draft: 15.7 m
- Maximum vessel size: 150,000 tonnes deadweight (DWT)
- Area: 127 Hectares Free Trade Zone, 28 Hectares non-Free Trade Zone
- Warehouse facilities: 178,000 m^{2}

PSA Singapore also has a 40-year contract to operate the tax-free Gwadar Port on the southwestern coast of Pakistan. Gwadar started operation in March 2008, with 3 multi-purpose berths, a 602-meter quay, and 12.5-meter depth. Another 9 berths are under construction, with a 20-meter depth. In 2015, it was announced that the port would be leased to the Chinese till 2059 and further developed under the China-Pakistan Economic Corridor.

== Terminals ==
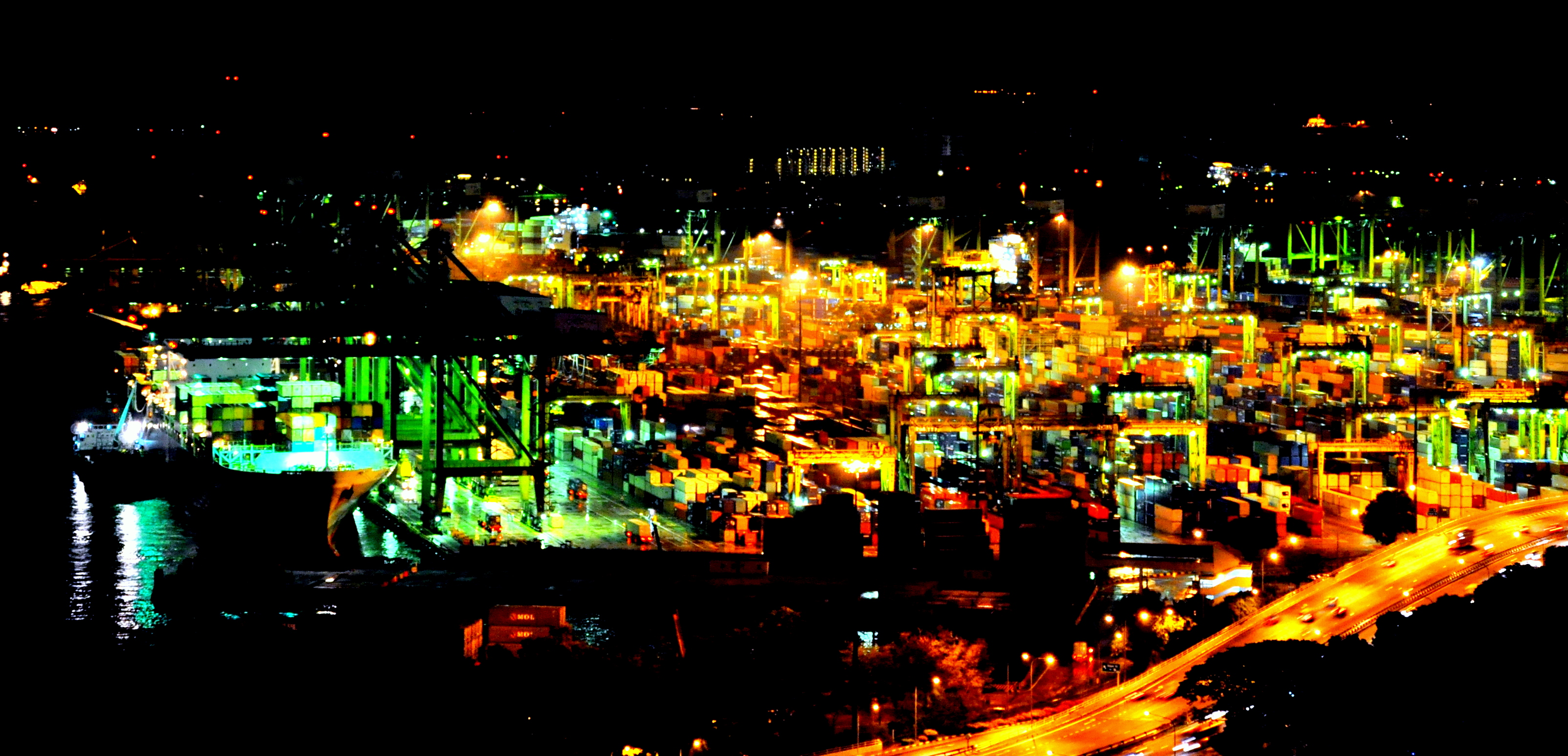
Tanjong Pagar container terminal by night (2009)

Port	Operator	Type	Berths	Quay length (m)	Quay cranes	Area (Ha)	Capacity (kTEU)
Brani (BT)	PSA	Container	8	2,325	26	84	
Cosco-PSA (CPT)	Cosco/PSA	Container	2	720		22.8	>1,000
Jurong	JTC	Multi-Purpose	32	5,600		155	
Jurong Island Terminal (JIT)	PSA	Container	2		2		
Keppel (KT)	PSA	Container	14	3,164	27	105	
Pasir Panjang (PPT 1)	PSA	Container	6	2,145	19	85	
Pasir Panjang (PPT 2)	PSA	Container	9	2,972	36	139	
Pasir Panjang (PPT 3)	PSA	Container	8	2,655	31	94	
Pasir Panjang (PPT 4)	PSA	Container	3	1,264	13	70	
Pasir Panjang (PPT 5)	PSA	Container	6	2,160	24	83	
Pasir Panjang (PPT 6)	PSA	Container	6	2,251	24	80	
Pasir Panjang Automobile Terminal	PSA	Ro-Ro	3	1,010		25	
Sembawang Wharves	PSA	General	4	660		28	
Tanjong Pagar (TPT) (decommissioned)	PSA	Container	7	2,097	0	79.5	
Tuas Megaport Finger 2 (Tuas F2)	PSA	Container	11		43		

== See also ==
- Jurong Island
- List of ports and harbors of the Pacific Ocean
- List of busiest container ports
- Pulau Bukom
