= Yuhua, Singapore =

Yuhua
- Subzone of Jurong East Planning Area

Name transcription(s)
  - Chinese: 裕华
  - Pinyin: Yù huá
  - Hokkien POJ: Jū-hôa
  - Teochew PUJ: Jŭ-huâ
  - Malay: Yuhua
  - Tamil: யூஹூவா
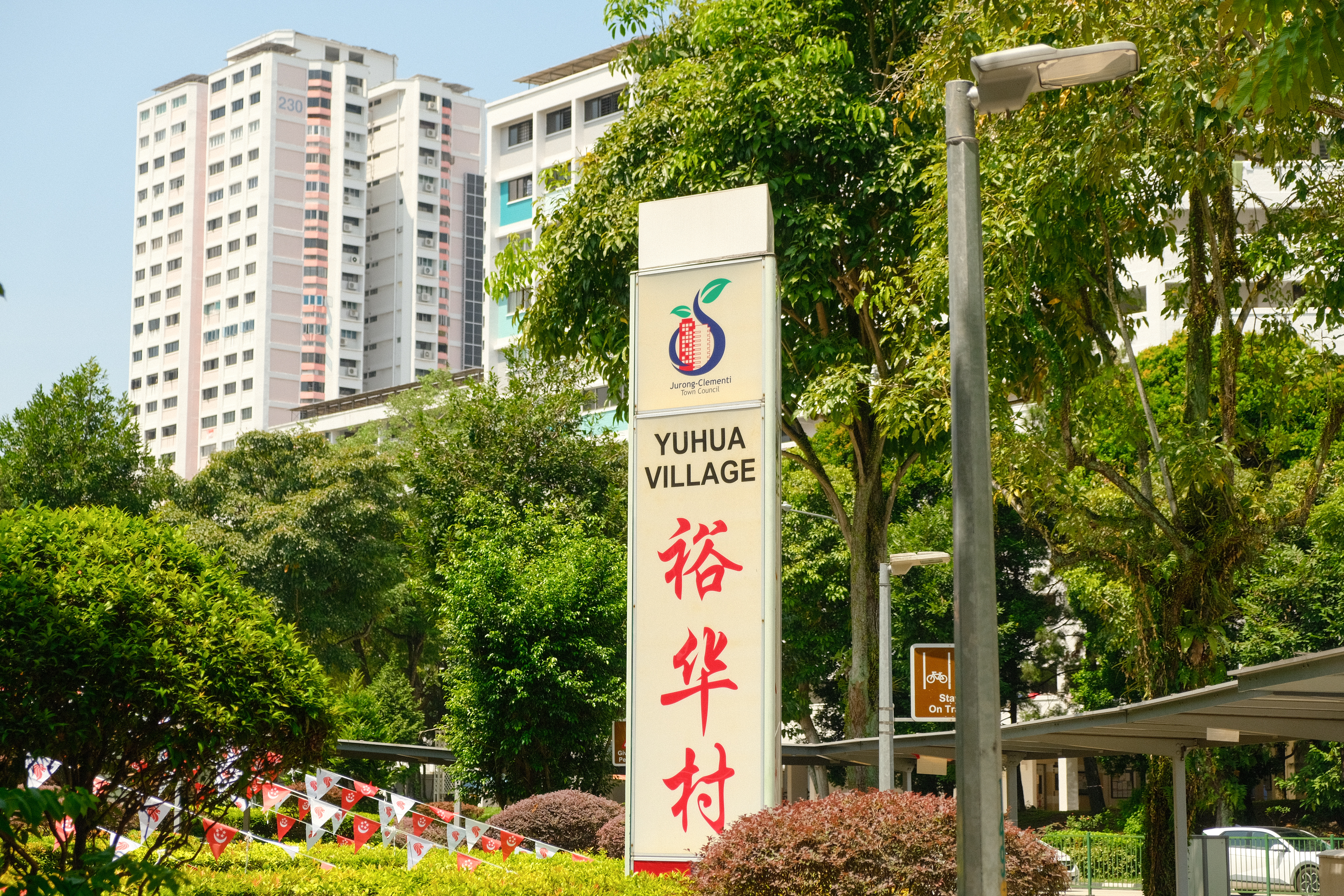
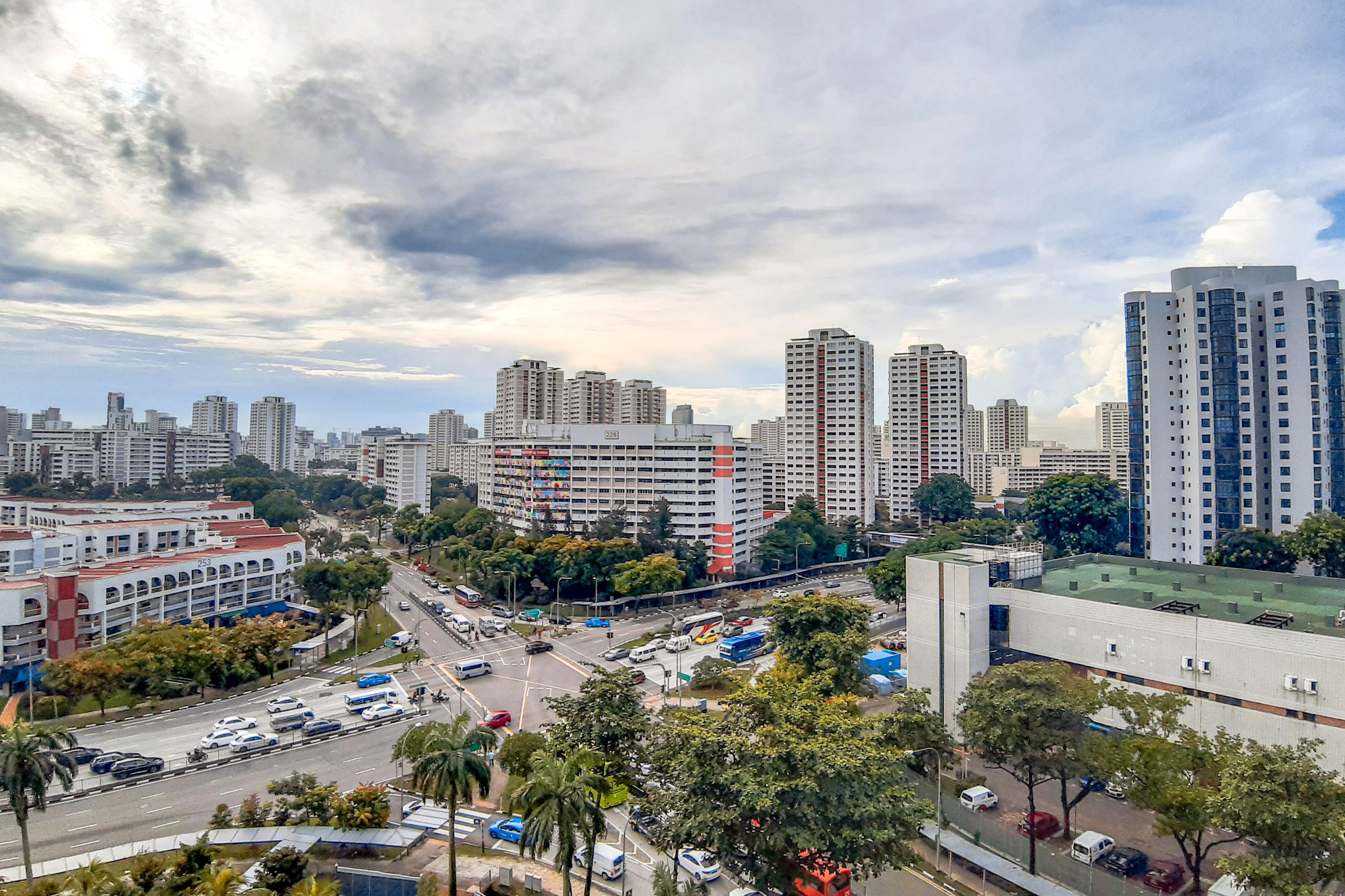
- From top left to right: Yuhua Village town centre, Yuhua Place town centre, aerial view of residential bulidings in Yuhua, Sri Arulmigu Murugan Temple, Tong Whye Temple

- Location of Yuhua in Singapore
- Coordinates: 1°20′36″N 103°44′10″E
- Country: Singapore

Area
  - Total: 1.70 km^{2} (0.66 sq mi)

Population (2026)
  - Total: 40,420
  - Density: 23,800/km^{2} (61,600/sq mi)

Yuhua, officially Joo Hwa until the 1980s, is a subzone region located in the town of Jurong East, Singapore. Yuhua comprises two subzones, Yuhua East and Yuhua West.

== Residential areas ==
=== HDB ===
Year built	Street	Blocks
1984–1985	Jurong East Street 31	317–328, 342–346, 351–353
1984–1985	Jurong	241–245, 347–350
1982–1985	Jurong East Street 21	209–240
1983–1984	Jurong East Street 24	246–254, 256–264
1984	Jurong East Street 13	101–116
2019	Jurong East Avenue 1	240A–240B

=== Condominium ===
- Ivory Heights (1986)
- Parc Oasis (1995)
- Westmere (1999)
- The Mayfair (2000)

== Demographics ==
As of 2026, Yuhua has a total population of 40,420 residents, with 19,750 males (48.8%) and 20,670 females (51.1%). 22,630 residents live in Yuhua East, while 17,790 live in Yuhua West.

=== Household ===
As of 2026, the two subzones in Yuhua had 34,730 residents living in HDB flats, representing 85.9% of the population. 5,280 residents (13.1%) live in condominiums and other apartments. No residents reside in landed properties.

The most common dwelling type in Yuhua is 5-Room and Executive HDB flats, comprising 11,580 residents, or 28.6% of the total population.

== Transportation ==
=== Roads ===
The main roads in this precinct are Jurong Town Hall Road, Boon Lay Way and Jurong East Central, which connects the precinct to the rest of Singapore through the AYE (Exit 13) or the PIE (Exit 29), with major roads (Jurong East Street 13/21/24/31/32, Jurong East Avenue 1) winding through the precinct.

=== Public transport ===
==== Mass Rapid Transit ====
There are 3 Mass Rapid Transit stations that serve the subzone, across 2 lines, the East–West Line, and the Jurong Region MRT line. The 3 stations are:

- EW25 Chinese Garden
- JE4 Toh Guan (future)
- JE3 Bukit Batok West (future)

==== Feeder bus services ====
Feeder services 333, 334 and 335 ply through different parts of the precinct and connect it to Jurong East MRT station, but only 335 goes to Chinese Garden MRT station.

==== Trunk Bus services ====
Most of the trunk bus services originate from Jurong East Bus Interchange.

Connection through other trunk bus services (not originating from Jurong East) to Jurong West and Clementi is available through 99 and 185, Bukit Batok and northwards through 176, 178, 180, 187 and 188, and eastwards through 66 & 506. 98 to Jurong East interchange, 502 to Orchard Road, Marina Bay Sands and the CBD, and 872 to Tengah.

== For the community ==
=== Hawker Centre ===
There are two hawker centres and markets in the precinct. The hawker centres, Yuhua Village Market and Food Centre (near future Bukit Batok West MRT station) and Yuhua Market and Hawker Centre (near Chinese Garden MRT station) are both located along Jurong East Ave 1. Several stalls in both hawker centres are also awarded the Michelin Bib Gourmand Award.

=== Community Centre ===
The precinct's community centre (Yuhua Community Club) or colloquially known as Yuhua CC, is located along Boon Lay Way, and is accessible by routes 99, 160, 334, 506 and 993. It is also co-located together with Jurong East Neighbourhood Police Centre.

=== Schools ===
There are 2 primary schools (Yuhua and Fuhua) and 2 secondary schools (JurongVille Secondary School and Crest Secondary School) in Yuhua.

=== Recreation ===
There is a neighbourhood park at the border of Jurong East Street 24 and a canal along the northern and western borders of the precinct. There is also a sports and recreation complex, Jurong East Sports Centre, located within a 7 minute walk away from Chinese Garden MRT station.

== Town centres ==
There are two town centres in this precinct located along Jurong East Avenue 1, housing the two hawker centres and markets.

== Places of worship ==
There are two Chinese temples, one Hindu temple, one mosque and one church in this precinct.

=== Chinese Temples ===
- Tong Whye Temple (通淮庙): Established in 1932 along Jurong Road by Hokkien migrants, the temple was named after its hometown temple in Quanzhou. It moved to its current premises in Yuhua in 1981.
- Bukit Timah Seu Teck Sean Thong (武吉知马修德善堂): Established in 1959 in Bukit Timah, the temple moved to its current premises in Yuhua in 1986. Dedicated to the Teochew monk Song Da Feng, the temple is part of the Blue Cross movement, providing free medical consultations and acupuncture treatments.

=== Hindu Temple ===
- Sri Arulmigu Murugan Temple: Established in 1993 through community efforts from the Hindu community, the temple was consecrated in 2004, and is the only Hindu temple in the Jurong area. The temple features a prominent statue of Lord Murugan and is the only Hindu temple in Singapore with a yagasalai, a dedicated space for fire rituals.

=== Mosque ===
- Masjid Al-Mukminin: Completed in 1987 under the Mosque Building Fund scheme, the mosque underwent major upgrading in 2006. It also offers Islamic learning programmes to residents.

=== Church ===
- Jurong Seventh-day Adventist Church: Originally split between English and Chinese congregations in Queenstown in the 1970s, the church moved to its current premises along Jurong East Street 13 in 1986. The two congregations officially merged in 2023 to form the unified Jurong Seventh-Day Adventist Church, offering services in both English and Chinese.

== Healthcare ==
Yuhua houses Jurong Polyclinic, as well as two nursing homes, Blue Cross Thong Kheng Home, and All Saints Home.

== Politics ==
Most of the Yuhua subarea falls under the purview of the namesake Yuhua division of the Jurong East-Bukit Batok GRC, and some of the western Yuhua under the Jurong Central SMC, both under the management of Jurong-Clementi-Bukit Batok Town Council. The two Members of Parliament are cabinet minister Grace Fu, who was in charge of Yuhua since 2006, and Xie Yao Quan, who managed Jurong Central since 2020.

Yuhua was previously existed as a SMC dating back in the 1984 election and Yu-Foo Yee Shoon was the first MP-elect in this area. Yuhua was briefly subsumed into a GRC from 1997 to 2011, before returning back to being a SMC between 2011 and 2025, after which Yuhua was subsumed into the present-day Jurong East-Bukit Batok GRC.
