= International Business Park =

Business park in Jurong East, Singapore

Coordinates: 1°19′46.5″N 103°44′51″E

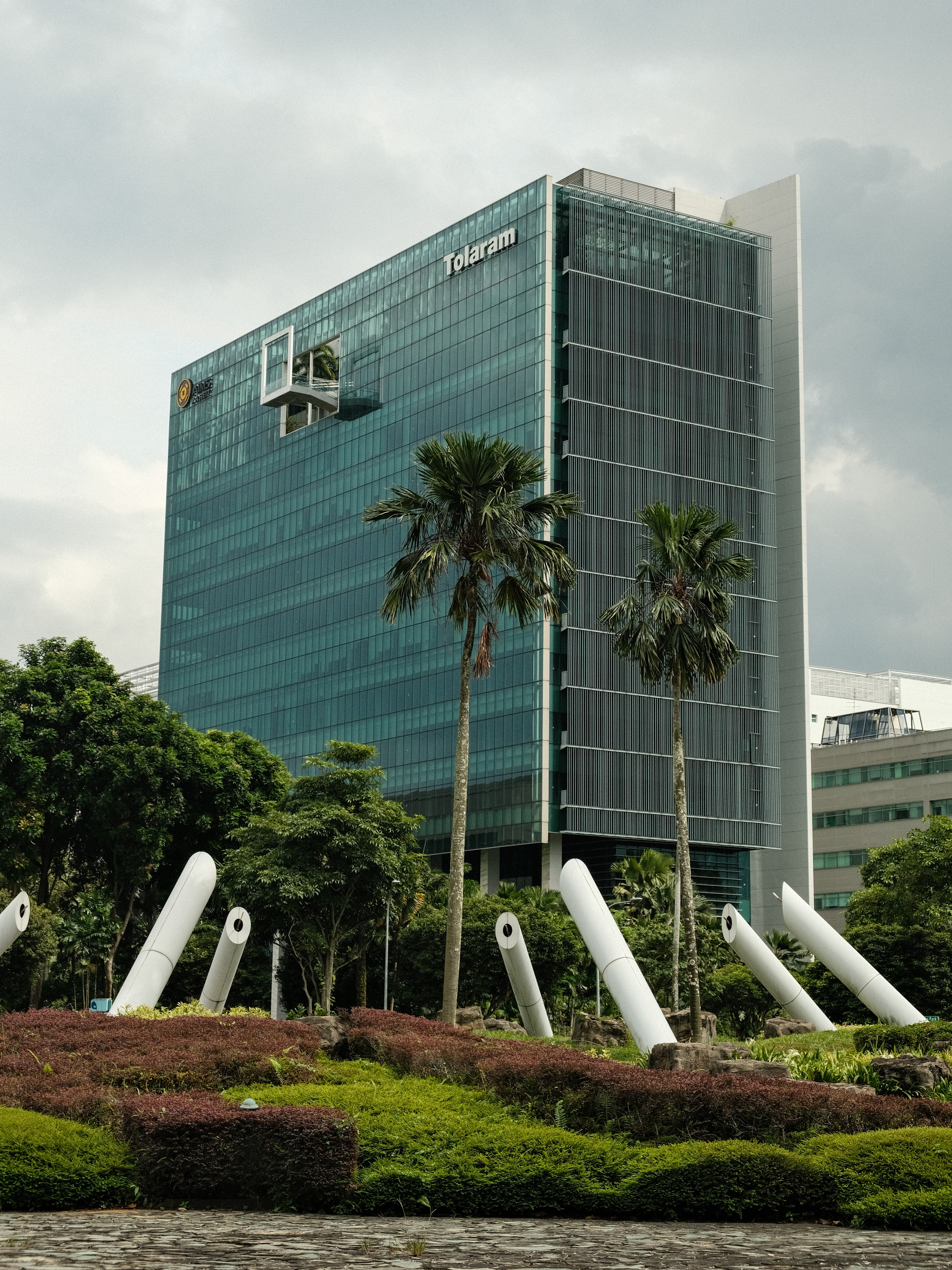
- IBP fountain and Tolaram HQ

- Location in Singapore
- Location: Jurong East, Singapore
- Opening date: 18 February 1992; 34 years ago
- Manager: JTC Corporation
- Size: 37 ha (91 acres)

International Business Park (Abbreviation: IBP; Malay: Taman Perniagaan Antarabangsa; Chinese: 国际商业园) is a high-tech business park managed by JTC Corporation in Jurong East, Singapore.

The business park serves as a location for companies to establish their regional headquarters, innovation hubs, and other business operations in Singapore's Western region. Companies located in IBP include Acer, Creative Technology, Evonik, Johnson Controls, Tolaram, ThyssenKrupp, TÜV SÜD, among others.

== History ==
Plans for the International Business Park were first announced in 1988 by then-chairman of JTC, Yeo Seck Teng. It was expected to be finished by 1990.

Established in February 1992, the International Business Park is Singapore's first business park.

10% of the park is allocated to three projects: the International Merchandising Mart, International Technology Centre and Archive Singapore.

== Transportation ==
=== Mass Rapid Transit (MRT) ===
The nearest MRT station from IBP is currently Jurong East MRT station, a 15-minute walk away. By 2028, IBP will be served by the Jurong Town Hall MRT station on the Jurong Region Line, located at the western end of IBP along Jurong Town Hall Road.

=== Bus ===
IBP is served by seven public bus services from two bus stops at the business park's northern and western end. The bus services are routes 49, 52, 99, 105, 178, 188 and 502. There are also shuttle buses provided to transport employees to Jurong East MRT station.

== See also ==
- Changi Business Park
