= Jurong East =

Planning Area and Regional Centre in West Region, Singapore

- Planning area and regional centre

Other transcription(s)
  - Chinese: 裕廊东 (Simplified) 裕廊東 (Traditional); Yùlángdōng (Pinyin); Jū-lông-tang (Hokkien POJ)
  - Malay: Jurong Timur (Rumi) جوروڠ تيمور (Jawi)
  - Tamil: ஜூரோங் கிழக்கு Jūrōṅ Kiḻakku (Transliteration)
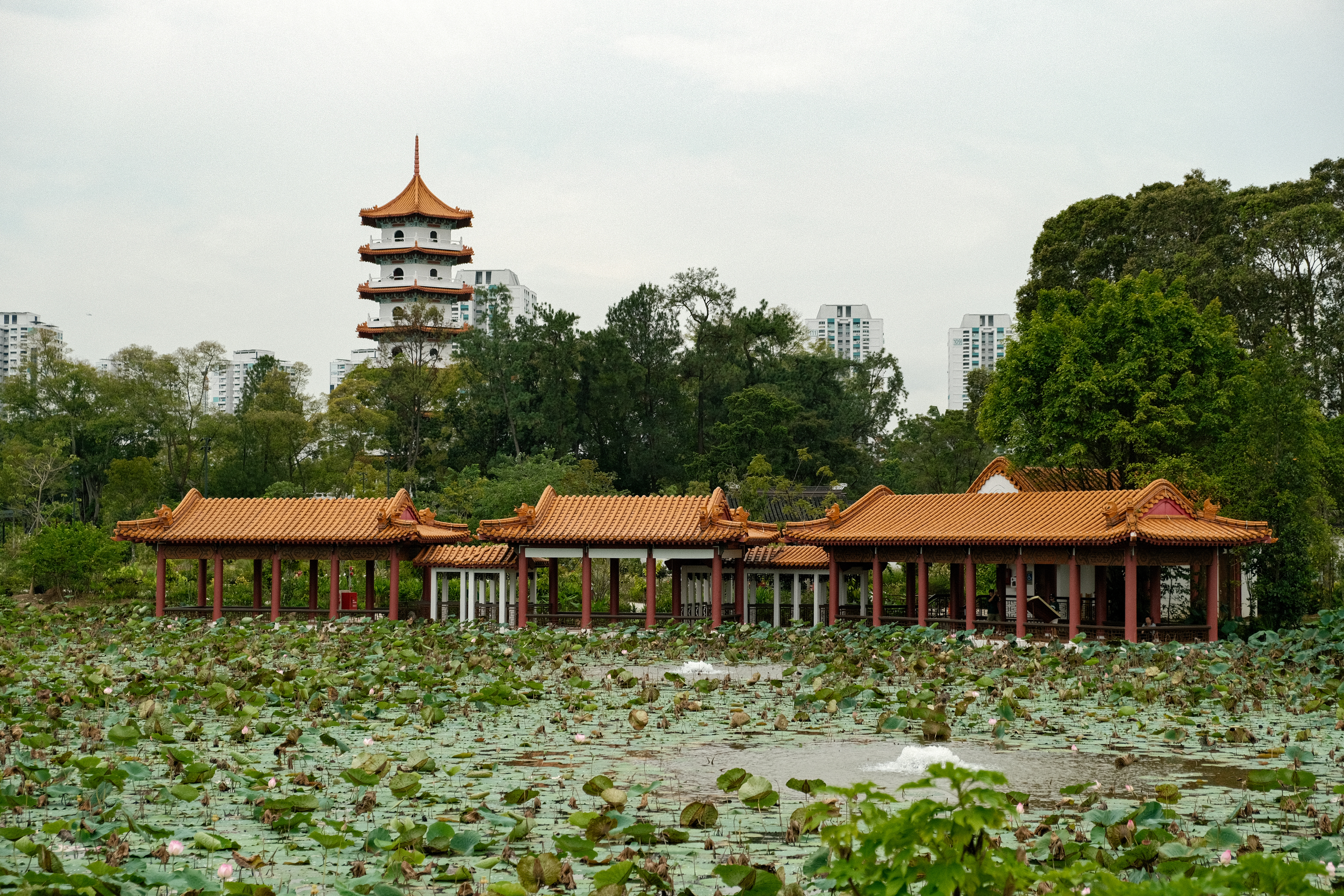
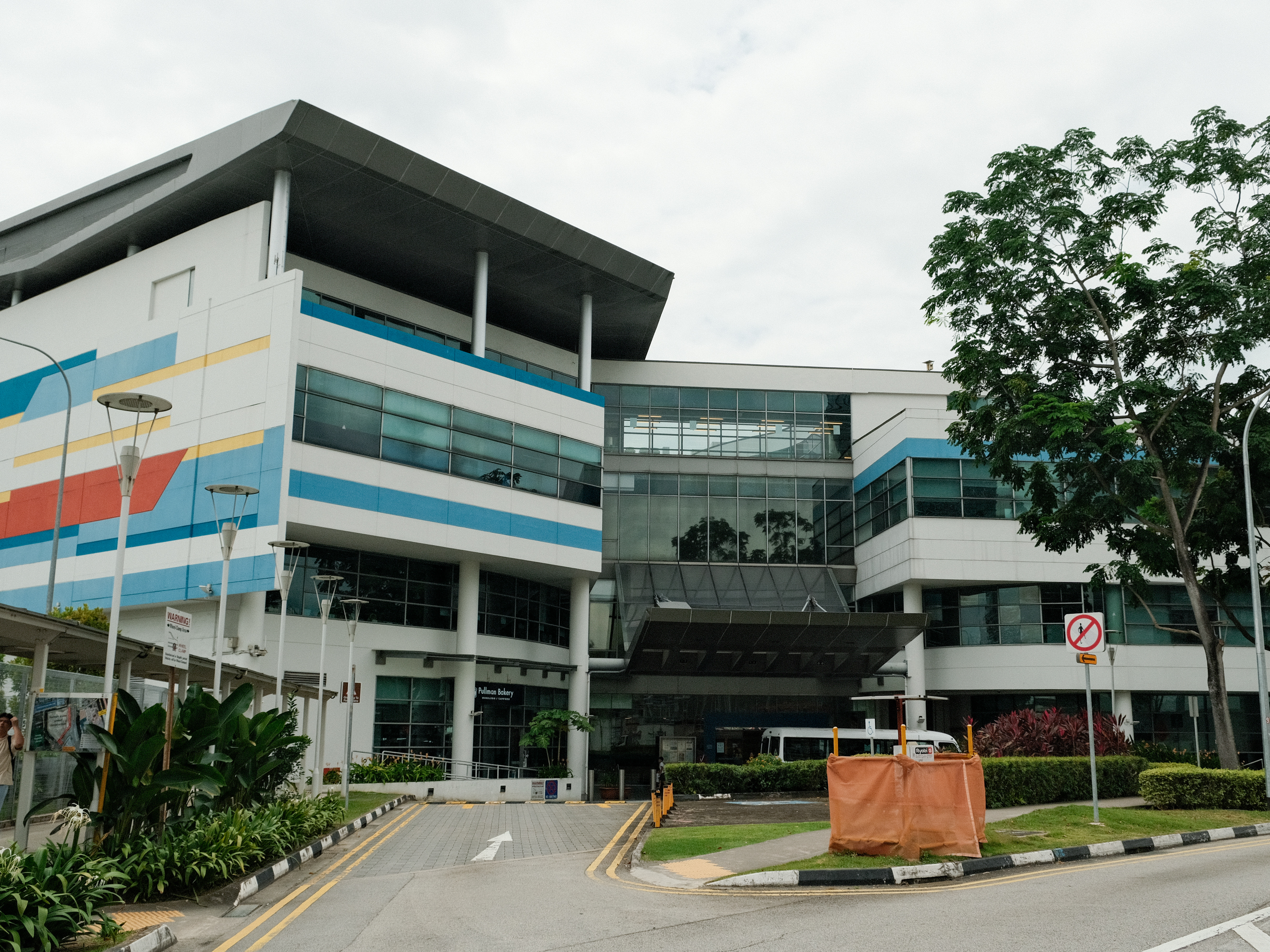
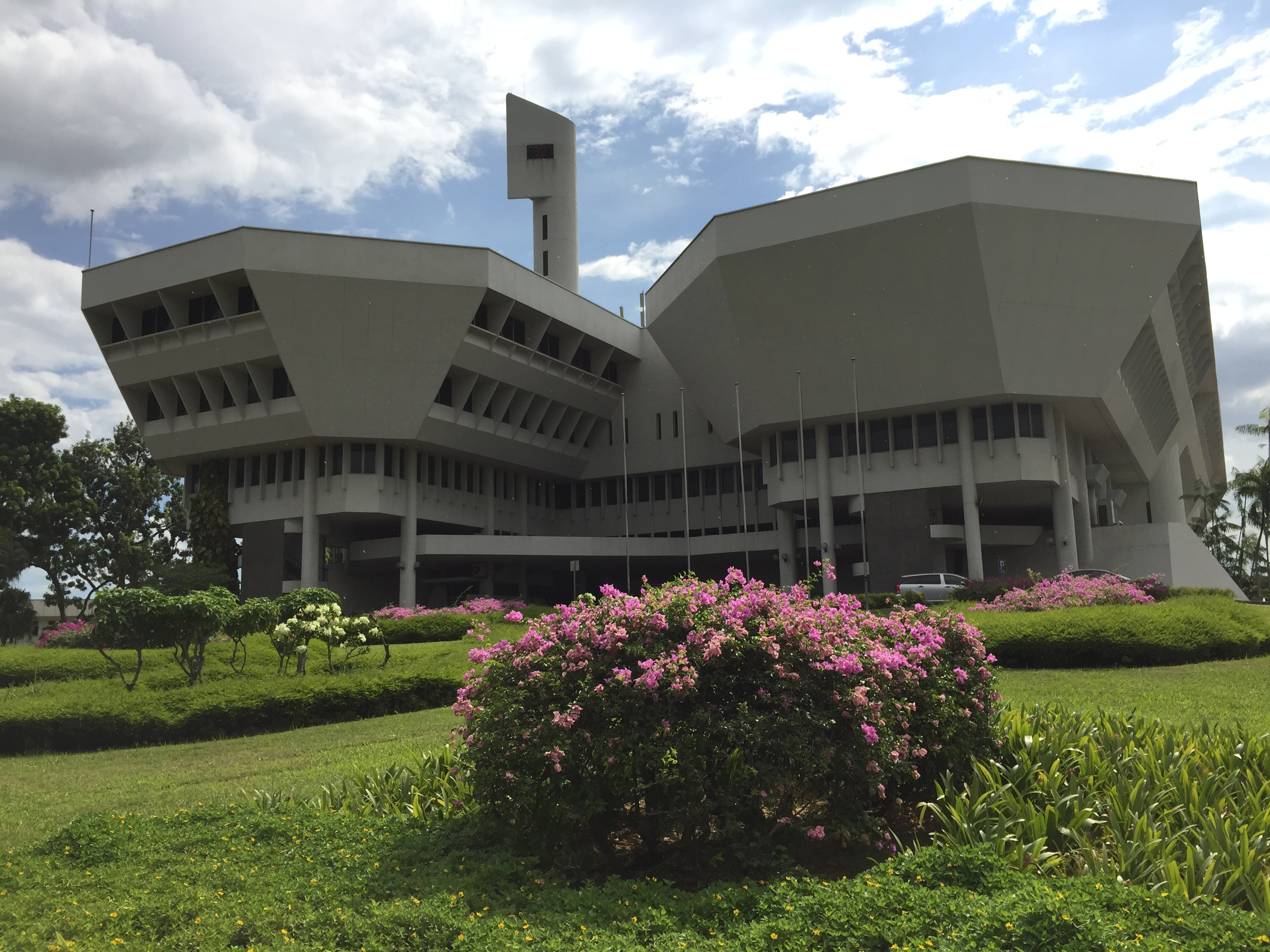
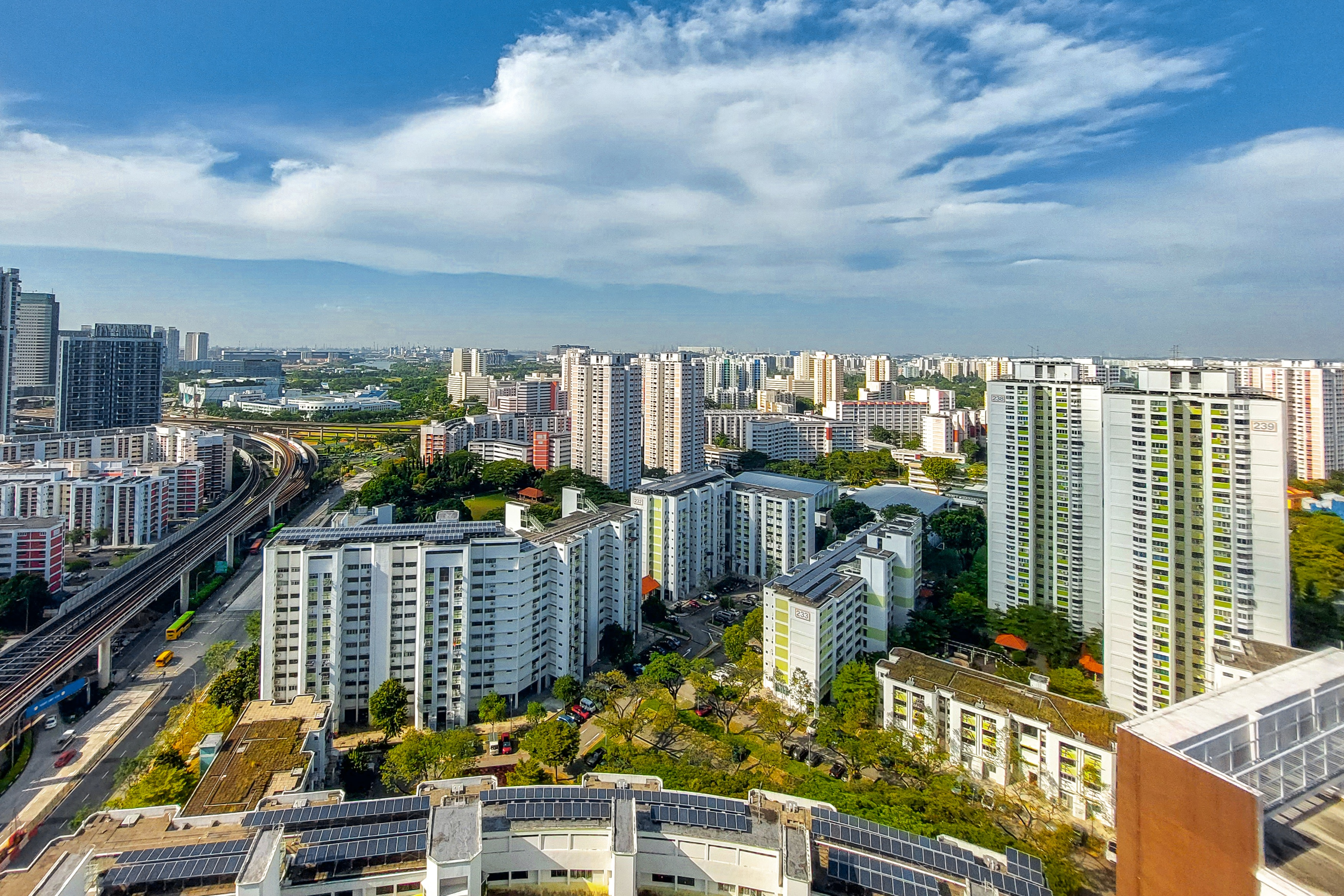
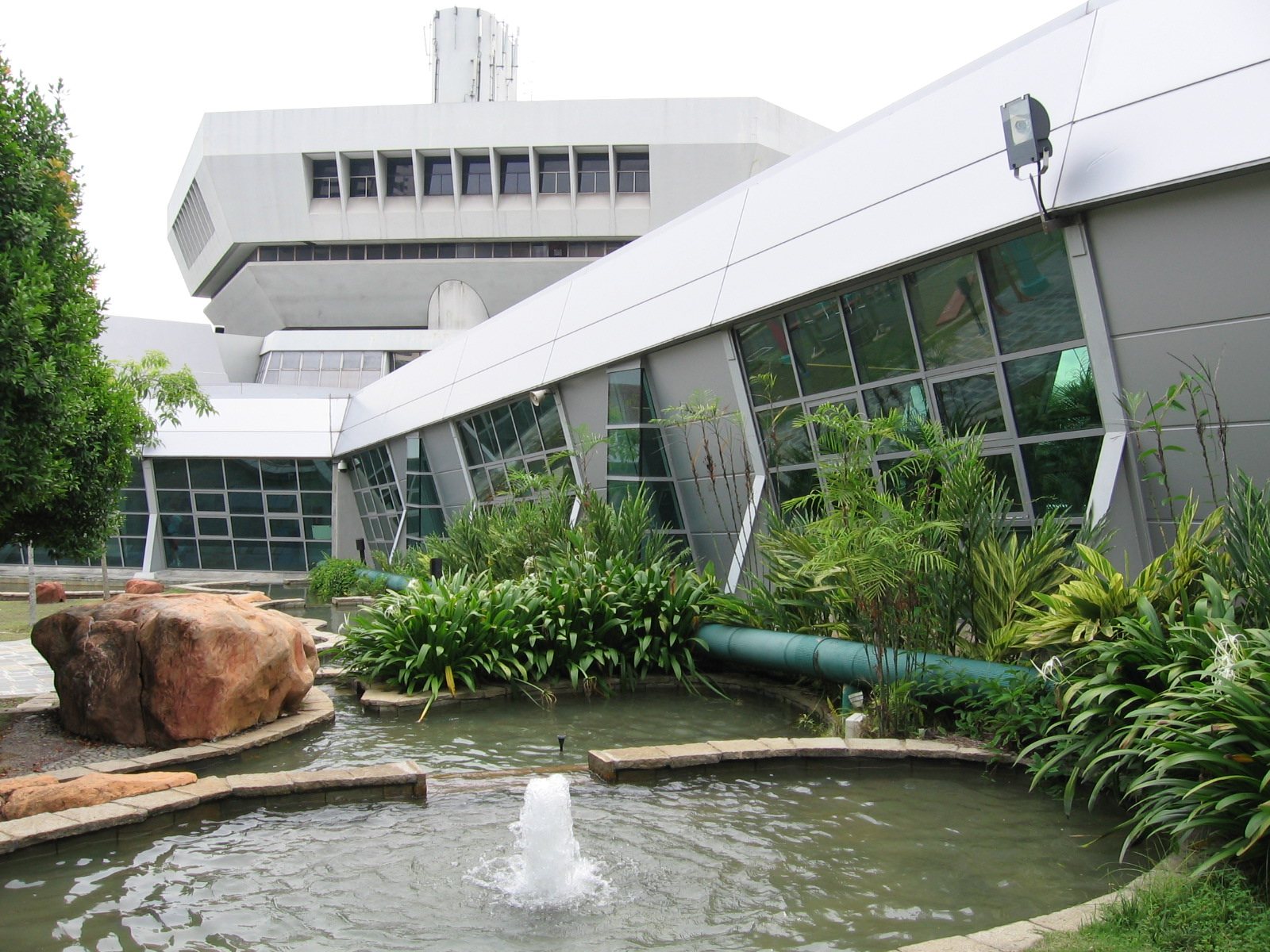
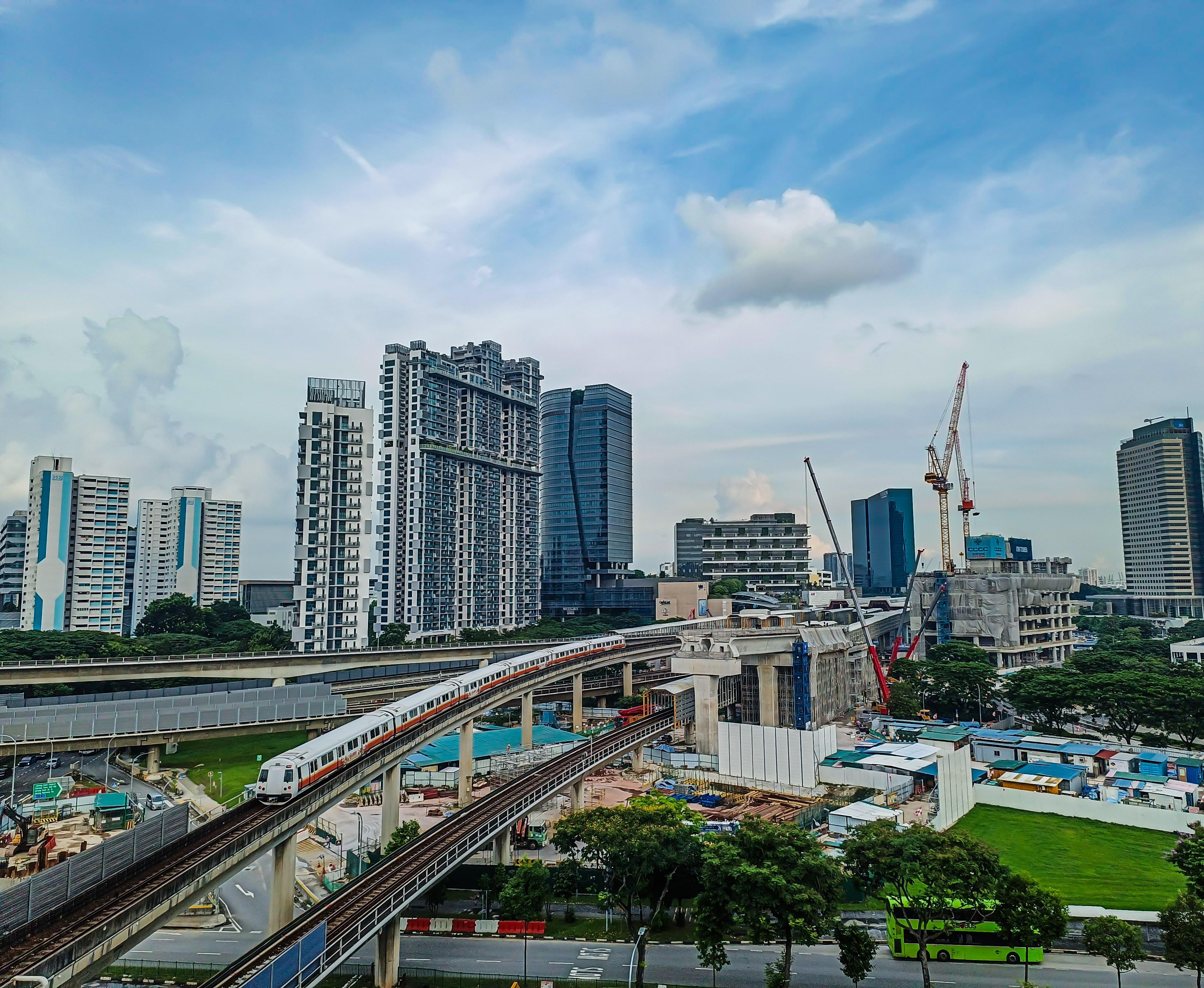
- From top left to right: Chinese Garden, Jurong Regional Library, Jurong Town Hall, HDB flats along Jurong East, Singapore Science Centre, Jurong East Central

- Location of Jurong East in Singapore
- Interactive map of Jurong East
- Location of Jurong East within Singapore
- Coordinates: 1°19′43.98″N 103°44′23.81″E
- Country: Singapore
- Region: West Region
- CDC: South West CDC
- Town councils: Jurong-Clementi Town Council; West Coast Town Council
- Constituencies: Jurong Central SMC; Jurong East–Bukit Batok GRC; West Coast–Jurong West GRC

Government
  - Mayor: South West CDC: Low Yen Ling
  - Members of Parliament: Jurong Central SMC: Xie Yao Quan; Jurong East–Bukit Batok GRC: Grace Fu; Rahayu Mahzam; West Coast–Jurong West GRC: Cassandra Lee; Shawn Huang

Area
  - Total: 17.86 km^{2} (6.90 sq mi)
  - Residential: 1.65 km^{2} (0.64 sq mi)

Population (2026)
  - Total: 72,160
  - Density: 4,040/km^{2} (10,460/sq mi)
- Demonym: Official: Jurong East resident

Ethnic groups (2025)
  - Chinese: 50,810
  - Malays: 12,150
  - Indians: 8,090
  - Others: 1,910
- Postal district: 22
- Projected ultimate: 30,000
- Dwelling units: 23,379

Jurong East (IPA: /ˈdʒʊrɒŋ iːst/ JOO-rong-EEST) is a planning area and regional centre in the West Region of Singapore. It is bordered by Tengah and Bukit Batok to the north, the Selat Jurong to the south, Clementi to the east, and Jurong West and Boon Lay to the west.

Jurong East began to urbanise in the 1970s as part of Singapore's wider industrial and residential decentralisation. Located about 20 kilometres (12 mi) west of the Central Area, it developed into a key commercial and transport hub serving western Singapore.

Jurong East forms part of the Jurong Lake District, which is planned by the Urban Redevelopment Authority as Singapore's largest business district outside the Central Area. The district is intended to support offices, housing, retail, leisure and community uses as part of the continued transformation of western Singapore.

== Subzones ==
There are 10 subzones in Jurong East.

- Jurong Port
- Penjuru Crescent
- Jurong River
- Teban Gardens
- Lakeside
- Jurong Gateway
- International Business Park
- Toh Guan
- Yuhua East
- Yuhua West

== Politics ==
The political landscape of Jurong East has undergone several electoral boundary realignments since its initial urbanization. Initially contained within the Jurong Constituency, the town was later divided into multiple single-member constituencies (SMCs), including Ayer Rajah SMC, Bukit Timah SMC, and Yuhua SMC.

In 1997, most of Jurong East and parts of neighboring Jurong West were consolidated into Bukit Timah GRC. Prior to the 2001 general election, this area was absorbed into the newly established Jurong GRC. However, southern industrial and residential enclaves—including Jurong Island, Jurong Port, Penjuru Crescent, and Teban Gardens—remained within West Coast GRC. Driven by population growth, the Yuhua precinct was carved out as an independent SMC ahead of the 2011 general election, maintaining its boundaries across three consecutive terms.

Major boundary realignments were instituted for the 2025 general election:

- Jurong East–Bukit Batok GRC: Covers the primary residential heartland of the town, represented by Members of Parliament Grace Fu and Rahayu Mahzam.
- Jurong Central SMC: Encompasses sections of Yuhua and the Jurong River subzone, represented by MP Xie Yao Quan.
- West Coast–Jurong West GRC: Includes the southern subzones (reconstituted from West Coast GRC), represented by MPs Cassandra Lee and Shawn Huang.

At the municipal level, estate maintenance and local administration are managed by the Jurong-Clementi Town Council and West Coast Town Council. Community development initiatives are coordinated under the South West Community Development Council (CDC), led by Mayor Low Yen Ling.

== Education ==
=== Primary and secondary schools ===
Jurong East is served by several general national education institutions under the Ministry of Education. Primary schools located within the planning area include:

- Fuhua Primary School
- Jurong Primary School
- Yuhua Primary School

Secondary education is provided by a range of specialized and mainstream institutions:

- Commonwealth Secondary School
- Crest Secondary School, a specialized school catering to students in the Skills-Based Curriculum stream
- Jurongville Secondary School

=== Workforce and adult training ===
Jurong East hosts the Devan Nair Institute for Employment and Employability, established in 2014 by the National Trades Union Congress (NTUC) to support adult education, continuous continuous professional learning, and career development initiatives within Singapore's West Region.

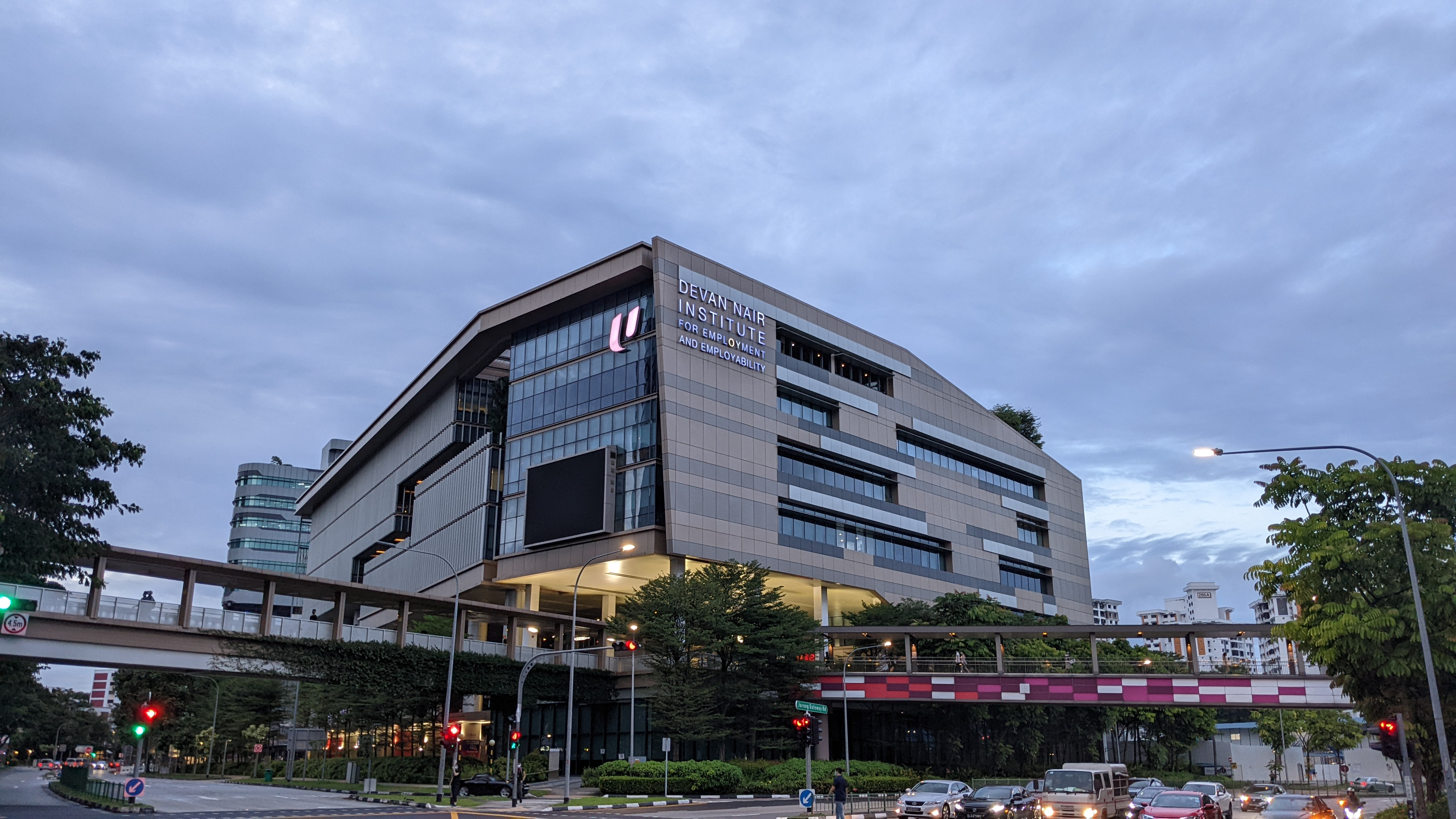
Devan Nair Institute for Employment and Employability

=== Informal science education ===
The area is home to Science Centre Singapore, a statutory board under the Ministry of Education. Serving as a prominent hub for informal STEM (Science, Technology, Engineering, and Mathematics) education, the institution features interactive public exhibits, educational enrichment programs, and specialized facilities, including the Omni-Theatre dome cinema.

== Recreation ==
Jurong East features a wide range of recreational, sporting, and leisure facilities catering to both residents and visitors.

=== Sports facilities ===
The town is served by the Jurong East Sport Centre, operated by ActiveSG. Situated on Jurong East Street 31, the complex comprises an air-conditioned sports hall, a 2,000-seat stadium field, an expanded ActiveSG fitness gym, and an outdoor swimming complex featuring a wave pool, lazy river, and water slides.

=== Parks and green spaces ===
- Jurong Lake Gardens: Singapore's third national garden covers 90 hectares surrounding Jurong Lake. It encompasses Lakeside Garden, alongside the restored Chinese Garden and Japanese Garden, which reopened to the public in September 2024 featuring enhanced biodiversity trails and heritage architecture.
- Park Connectors: Jurong East is integrated into the Park Connector Network (PCN), including the Pandan Gardens Park Connector and Jurong Park Connector, enabling walking and cycling routes towards Pandan Reservoir and adjacent residential zones.
- Neighbourhood Parks: Smaller local parks include Toh Guan Neighbourhood Park, Hong Kah East Neighbourhood Park, and Yuhua Village Neighbourhood Park.

=== Attractions and family entertainment ===
- Science Centre Singapore: A regional educational attraction featuring interactive exhibits, the Omni-Theatre dome cinema, and the indoor snow facility Snow City.
- Commercial Entertainment: Retail malls adjacent to Jurong East MRT station—such as IMM, Jem, and Westgate—house multiplex cinemas, indoor activity venues, and family entertainment centres.

== Transport ==
Transport infrastructure in Jurong East relies on high-density transit-oriented development (TOD), functioning as a major multimodal transit gateway for Singapore's West Region, surrounding residential towns, industrial complexes, and commercial centers.

=== Rail connectivity ===
Jurong East MRT station serves as the primary rail interchange for western Singapore. It connects the East–West Line (EWL) and North–South Line (NSL), functioning as the western terminus for the NSL.

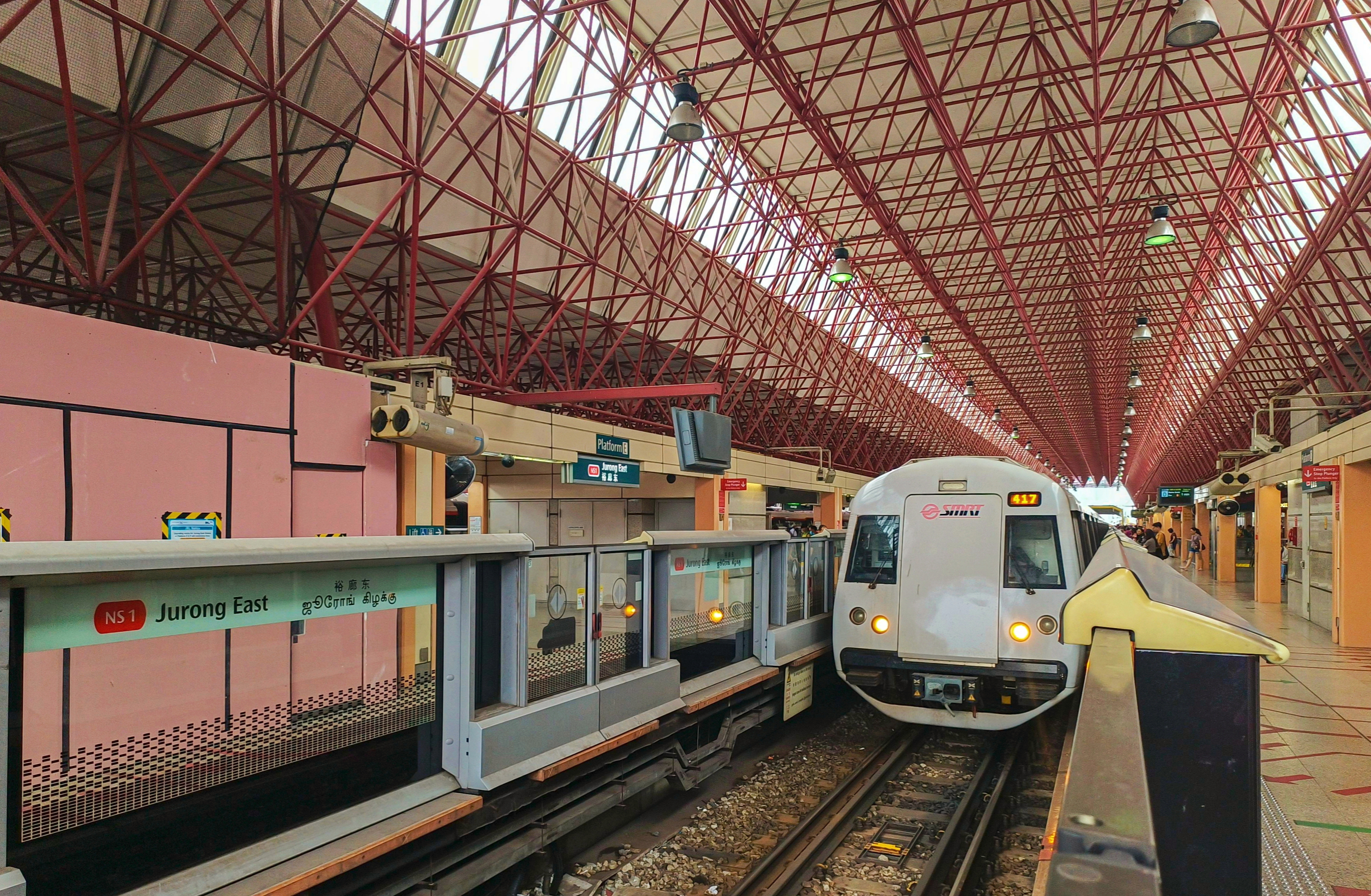
Jurong East MRT station

To support the expansion of the Jurong Lake District as a regional commercial hub, several major MRT infrastructure projects are integrated into the subzone:

- Jurong Region Line (JRL): An elevated, medium-capacity rail network designed to serve Jurong East, Tengah, the Jurong Innovation District, and Nanyang Technological University (NTU). Key stations serving the area include Jurong East and Jurong Town Hall MRT station.
- Cross Island Line (CRL): Future developments of the underground CRL, including the planned Jurong Lake District MRT station, will link Jurong East directly to northeastern and eastern Singapore.

=== Bus operations and Integrated Transport Hub ===
Bus networks in Jurong East act as feeders to residential precincts like Yuhua and Teban Gardens, as well as nearby industrial areas including Jurong Port and the International Business Park.

- Jurong East Bus Interchange: Located adjacent to the MRT station, providing connections to regional and feeder bus services. Operations were temporarily relocated to facilitate construction of a multi-modal Integrated Transport Hub (ITH).
- Jurong Town Hall Bus Interchange: Built to complement high-density regional bus operations, featuring elevated pedestrian connections via the J-Walk network back to Jurong East MRT station.

=== Road infrastructure ===
The road network in Jurong East separates high-volume commercial freight traffic heading toward industrial ports from residential and retail vehicular traffic:

- Pan Island Expressway (PIE): Bounds the northern section of Jurong East, connecting to Bukit Batok, Toh Guan, and eastern regional hubs.
- Ayer Rajah Expressway (AYE): Bounds the southern section, serving as a primary freight and commuter corridor connecting Jurong Port to the Central Business District.
- Major arterial roads: Roads including Boon Lay Way, Jurong Town Hall Road, and Jurong East Central accommodate localized bus routes and cross-subzone transit.

== Demographics ==
=== Population history ===
Resident population history
Year	Pop.	±% p.a.
2000	89,090	—
2005	86,010	−0.70%
2010	88,120	+0.49%
2015	84,980	−0.72%
2020	78,600	−1.55%
2025	72,960	−1.48%
2026	72,160	−1.10%

Between 2000 and 2026, the resident population of Jurong East experienced a gradual overall decline, falling from 89,090 to 72,160 residents.

This demographic contraction is primarily a result of population ageing alongside the maturation of long-established public housing estates in the town. As these residential precincts mature, family units shrink as children grow up and move to newer housing estates elsewhere in Singapore.

Consequently, the reduction in average household sizes has led to a lower overall population density in the area despite no significant loss in total dwelling units.

=== Age profile ===
The demographic structure of Jurong East displays a super-aged profile, characterized by an inverted population pyramid where elderly dependents significantly outnumber young dependents.

Population pyramid of Jurong East in 2026

Elderly dependents aged 65 and above account for 26.2% (18,940 residents) of the total population, whereas young dependents aged 0–14 years represent only 9.3% (6,690 residents).

The economically active population aged 15–64 constitutes the remaining 64.5% (46,560 residents), comprising 22,940 males and 23,620 females.

Age group (years)	Males	Females	Total population	% of total population
0–4	860	820	1,680	2.33
5–9	1,160	1,070	2,230	3.09
10–14	1,440	1,340	2,780	3.85
15–19	1,700	1,640	3,340	4.63
20–24	1,990	1,870	3,860	5.35
25–29	2,520	2,270	4,790	6.64
30–34	2,400	2,250	4,650	6.44
35–39	2,190	2,360	4,550	6.30
40–44	2,080	2,300	4,380	6.07
45–49	2,190	2,590	4,780	6.62
50–54	2,550	2,780	5,330	7.38
55–59	2,530	2,670	5,200	7.20
60–64	2,790	2,890	5,680	7.87
65–69	2,870	3,170	6,040	8.37
70–74	2,700	2,770	5,470	7.58
75–79	2,000	2,160	4,160	5.76
80–84	790	930	1,720	2.38
85–89	430	610	1,040	1.44
90+	180	330	510	0.71

Peak concentrations occur in the 65–69 age bracket for both males and females, giving the town a high overall dependency ratio driven largely by senior citizens rather than children.

Age group (years)	Males	Females	Total population	% of total population
0–14	3,460	3,230	6,690	9.3
15–64	22,940	23,620	46,560	64.5
65+	8,970	9,970	18,940	26.2

=== Household structure and housing ===
Resident population by dwelling type in Jurong East (2000−2026)
Year	HDB flats		Condominiums and other apartments	
Year	Pop.	Percentage	Pop.	Percentage
2000	82,040	92.1%	6,660	7.4%
2005	77,750	90.4%	7,950	9.2%
2010	80,340	91.2%	7,430	8.4%
2015	77,650	91.4%	6,930	8.2%
2020	70,940	90.3%	6,910	8.8%
2025	66,030	90.5%	6,160	8.4%
2026	65,310	90.5%	6,100	8.5%

Public housing managed by the Housing and Development Board (HDB) is the dominant form of residential land use in Jurong East, housing 90.5% (65,310 residents) of the local populace, compared to the national average of 75.5%.

Condominiums and private apartments account for 8.5% (6,100 residents), with no landed residential properties recorded within the planning area.

The most prevalent dwelling category consists of high-density 5-room and Executive flats, occupied by 33.2% of residents. The average household size in the town stands at 2.92 persons across 26,400 households, with two-person (26.9%) and three-person (25.0%) households forming the majority.

The home ownership rate among residents is 93.2%, exceeding the national average of 91.2%, supported by national public housing schemes.

=== Ethnicity ===
Jurong East exhibits a multi-ethnic population distribution, regulated by national housing quotas under the Ethnic Integration Policy (EIP) to maintain racial integration across public housing estates.

Ethnic groups in Jurong East (2000−2025)
Year	Chinese		Malays		Indians		Others	
Year	Pop.	Percentage	Pop.	Percentage	Pop.	Percentage	Pop.	Percentage
2000	67,030	75.2%	14,922	16.7%	6,432	7.2%	705	0.8%
2010	62,155	70.5%	14,084	16%	9,757	11.1%	2,122	2.4%
2015	60,130	70.7%	13,740	16.2%	9,150	10.8%	1,970	2.3%
2020	55,440	70.5%	12,700	16.2%	8,610	11%	1,850	2.4%
2025	50,810	69.7%	12,150	16.7%	8,090	11.1%	1,910	2.6%

Residents of Chinese ethnicity comprise 69.7% (50,810) of the populace, which is slightly below the national proportion of 73.9%. Minority ethnic groups include Malays at 16.7% (12,150), Indians at 11.1% (8,090), and other ethnic groups at 2.6% (1,910).

=== Religion ===
Religious affiliation in Jurong East (2025 est.)
1. Buddhism (30.7%)
2. No religion (19.7%)
3. Christianity (13.7%)
4. Islam (18.5%)
5. Taoism (9.70%)
6. Hinduism (7.50%)
7. Sikhism (0.10%)

In terms of religious diversity, Buddhism is the most widely practiced faith at 30.7% (20,600 residents), followed by residents declaring no religious affiliation at 19.7% (13,200 residents). Other prominent religious affiliations include Islam (18.5%), Christianity (13.7%), Taoism (9.7%), Hinduism (7.5%), and Sikhism (0.1%).

=== Education ===
Highest qualification attained of non-student resident population aged 15 years and over (2025 est.)
Qualification	Percentage	Singapore average
Below secondary	26.0%	19.9%
Secondary	15.0%	14.6%
Post-secondary (non-tertiary)	12.6%	11.1%
Polytechnic diploma	10.2%	10.2%
Professional qualification and other diploma	8.6%	7.5%
University	27.6%	36.7%

The literacy rate among non-student residents aged 15 and over is 98.4%, reflecting high investment in human capital.

University degree holders account for 27.6% of the non-student resident population, which is below the national average of 36.7%.

=== Language ===
Languages most frequently spoken at home, Jurong East (2025 est.)
Languages	percent
English	53.8%
Mandarin Chinese	29.4%
Malay	7.8%
Non-Mandarin varieties	5.2%
Tamil	3.17%
Other Indian languages	0.48%
Others	0.32%

English is the primary language spoken at home, used by 53.8% of residents as their main medium of communication. This is followed by Mandarin Chinese (29.4%), Malay (7.8%), non-Mandarin Chinese dialects (5.2%), and Tamil (3.17%).

Furthermore, 69.3% of residents are biliterate, with English and Chinese forming the most common bilingual combination at 46.4%.

=== Employment ===
The total resident labour force comprises 43,200 individuals aged 15 and over, of whom 42,200 are actively employed. This corresponds to a high employment rate of 97.7%, above the national benchmark of 96.7%. The remaining 23,800 residents aged 15 and over are classified as economically inactive.

Employment in the town is heavily supported by proximity to major commercial nodes in the Jurong Lake District and industrial parks like the International Business Park.

=== Income ===
Household income levels span across various brackets, with the median gross monthly employment income falling within the S3,000–S5,999 range.

Gross monthly employment income of employed residents aged 15 years and over (2025 est.)
Employment income	Percentage	Singapore average
Below S$1,000	3.6%	3.9%
S$1,000–S$1,999	11.8%	9.4%
S$2,000–S$2,999	14.5%	9.5%
S$3,000–S$3,999	10.7%	10.3%
S$4,000–S$4,999	9.5%	8.8%
S$5,000–S$5,999	8.3%	8.2%
S$6,000–S$6,999	9.0%	6.9%
S$7,000–S$7,999	5.0%	5.9%
S$8,000–S$8,999	5.2%	5.2%
S$9,000–S$9,999	4.5%	4.5%
S$10,000–S$10,999	3.8%	4.3%
S$11,000–S$11,999	3.3%	3.5%
S$12,000–S$14,999	5.9%	7.3%
S$15,000–S$19,999	2.8%	5.8%
S$20,000 and over	2.4%	6.7%

Monthly household employment income (2025 est.)
Household employment income	Percentage	Singapore average
No employed person	15.9%	14.2%
Below S$1,000	0.8%	1.2%
S$1,000–S$1,999	4.2%	3.4%
S$2,000–S$2,999	6.4%	3.7%
S$3,000–S$3,999	4.5%	4.2%
S$4,000–S$4,999	3.8%	3.7%
S$5,000–S$5,999	4.5%	4.1%
S$6,000–S$6,999	4.2%	4.0%
S$7,000–S$7,999	3.4%	3.6%
S$8,000–S$8,999	5.3%	3.8%
S$9,000–S$9,999	4.9%	3.7%
S$10,000–S$10,999	3.8%	3.8%
S$11,000–S$11,999	4.5%	3.7%
S$12,000–S$12,999	4.2%	3.5%
S$13,000–S$13,999	3.0%	3.2%
S$14,000–S$14,999	3.4%	2.8%
S$15,000–S$17,499	6.1%	6.2%
S$17,500–S$19,999	4.5%	5.5%
S$20,000–S$24,999	4.9%	8.0%
S$25,000–S$29,999	4.5%	5.0%
S$30,000–S$34,999	1.9%	3.3%
S$35,000 and over	1.5%	5.5%

== Economy ==
=== Decentralisation and Commercial Clustering ===
The economic geography of Jurong East is structured around state-led spatial decentralisation. Initiated to relieve infrastructure strain on the Central Area, the Jurong Lake District project covers 360 hectares (890 acres), combining commercial, high-tech industry, and leisure zones.

- Industrial and Maritime Logistics Zones: Heavy industrial and manufacturing activities are concentrated around Jurong Port, Jurong River, Penjuru Crescent, and the Pandan industrial corridor, alongside designated commercial land parcels in Toh Guan and Teban Gardens.
- High-Value Business Parks: The International Business Park (IBP) serves as a designated cluster for research and development, corporate management, and technology firms, integrating commercial office space within a suburban setting.
- Retail Agglomeration: The precinct surrounding the Jurong East transit hub features a high-density retail cluster comprising major commercial complexes—such as IMM, Jem, and Westgate—creating a regional commercial nexus serving the broader western catchment area.

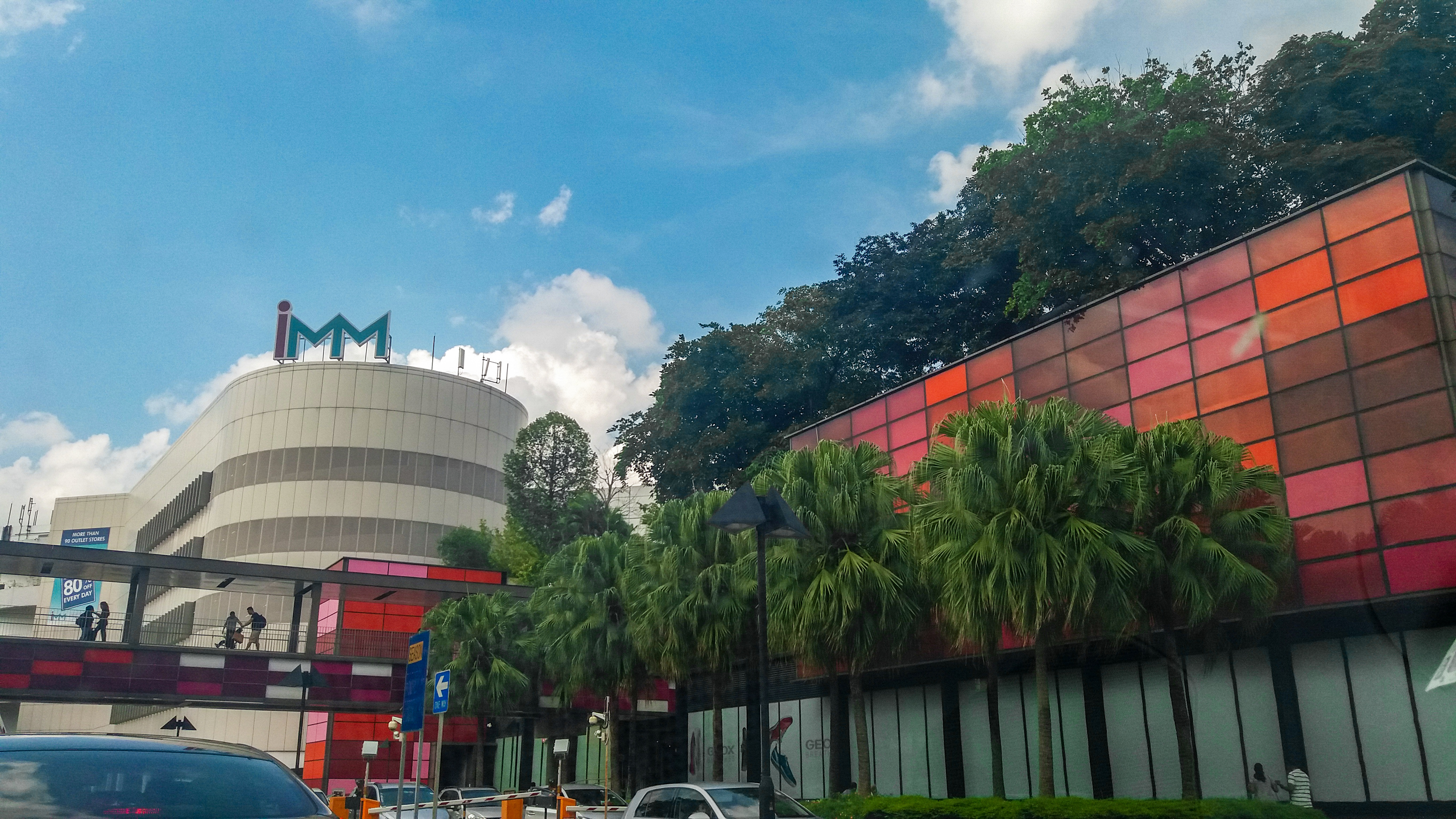
IMM

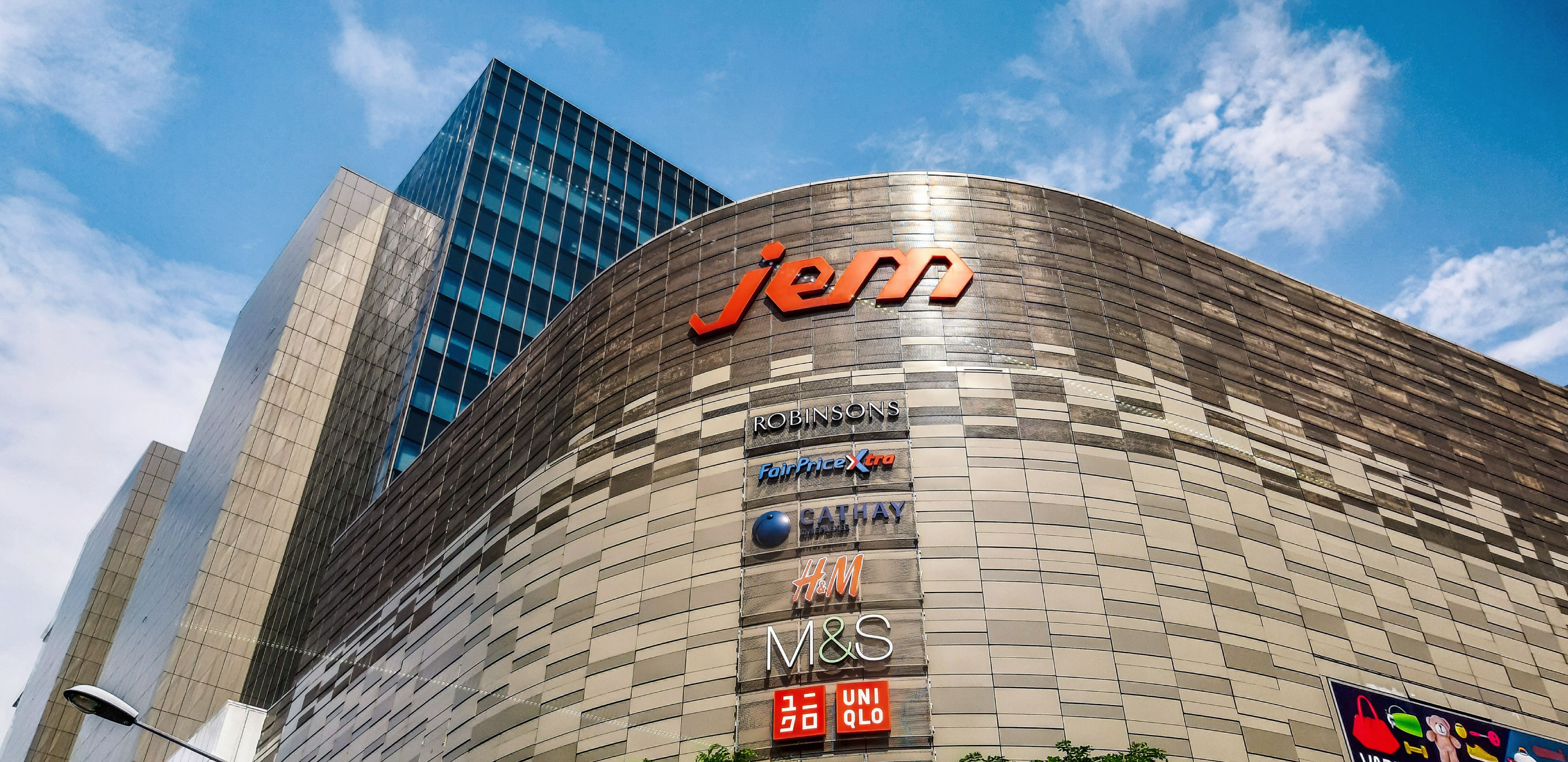
Jem

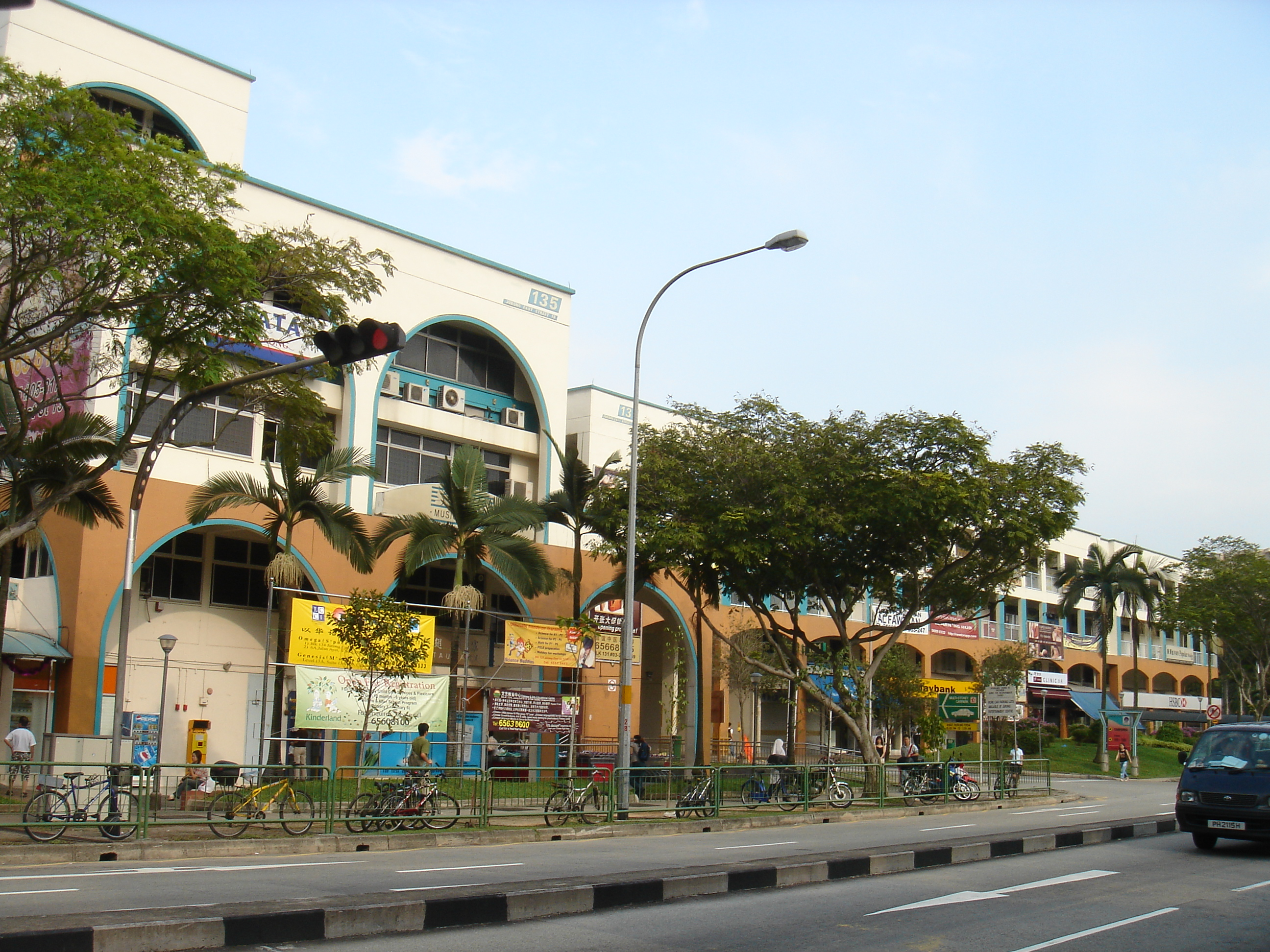
Retail shops at Jurong East, near the Jurong East MRT station

== Healthcare ==
Healthcare in Jurong East is provided through a network of primary, acute, and community medical facilities operated primarily under the National University Health System (NUHS) regional health cluster.

=== Primary care ===
Primary healthcare is anchored by Jurong Polyclinic, managed by National University Polyclinics (NUP). Originally established in 1988 in the Yuhua precinct and upgraded in 2007, the polyclinic provides subsidized outpatient medical treatment, maternal and child health services, and chronic disease management. To accommodate the needs of a rapidly ageing population, plans were announced to relocate the polyclinic to a larger, elder-friendly site integrated with a 700-bed nursing home.

=== Hospitals ===
Inpatient and emergency care is centralized within an integrated healthcare hub located adjacent to Jurong East MRT station. The development houses two main institutions:

- Ng Teng Fong General Hospital (NTFGH): A 700-bed acute tertiary hospital designed to provide comprehensive medical, surgical, and emergency services for the western region of Singapore.
- Jurong Community Hospital (JCH): A 400-bed post-acute and step-down facility adjoined to NTFGH. It focuses on sub-acute care, rehabilitation, and palliative services to assist patient reintegration into the community.

Both hospitals opened in June 2015, replacing initial healthcare plans under the Singapore Master Plan 2003 for a single facility, originally conceived as Jurong General Hospital.
