= IMM (Singapore) =

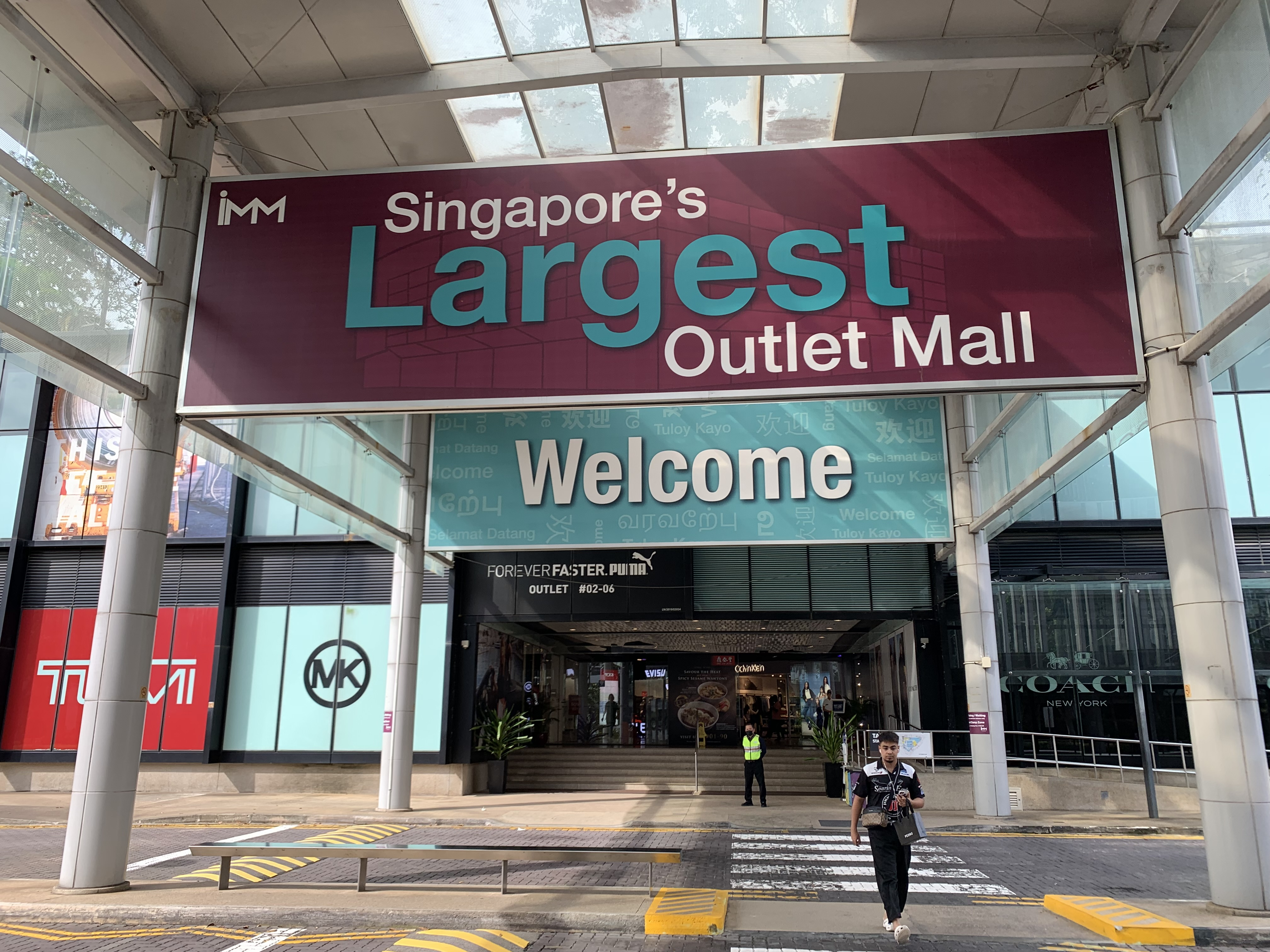
- An entrance to the IMM as of 2025
- Location: Singapore
- Coordinates: 1.334992°N 103.747105°E
- Address: 2 Jurong East Street 21, Singapore 609601
- Opened: 29 June 1991; 35 years ago
- Owner: CapitaLand Integrated Commercial Trust
- Num. of stores: 248 retail, 388 non-retail
- Floor area: 944,575 square feet (87,753.9 m^{2})
- Public transit: NS1 EW24 Jurong East
- Website: imm.sg/en

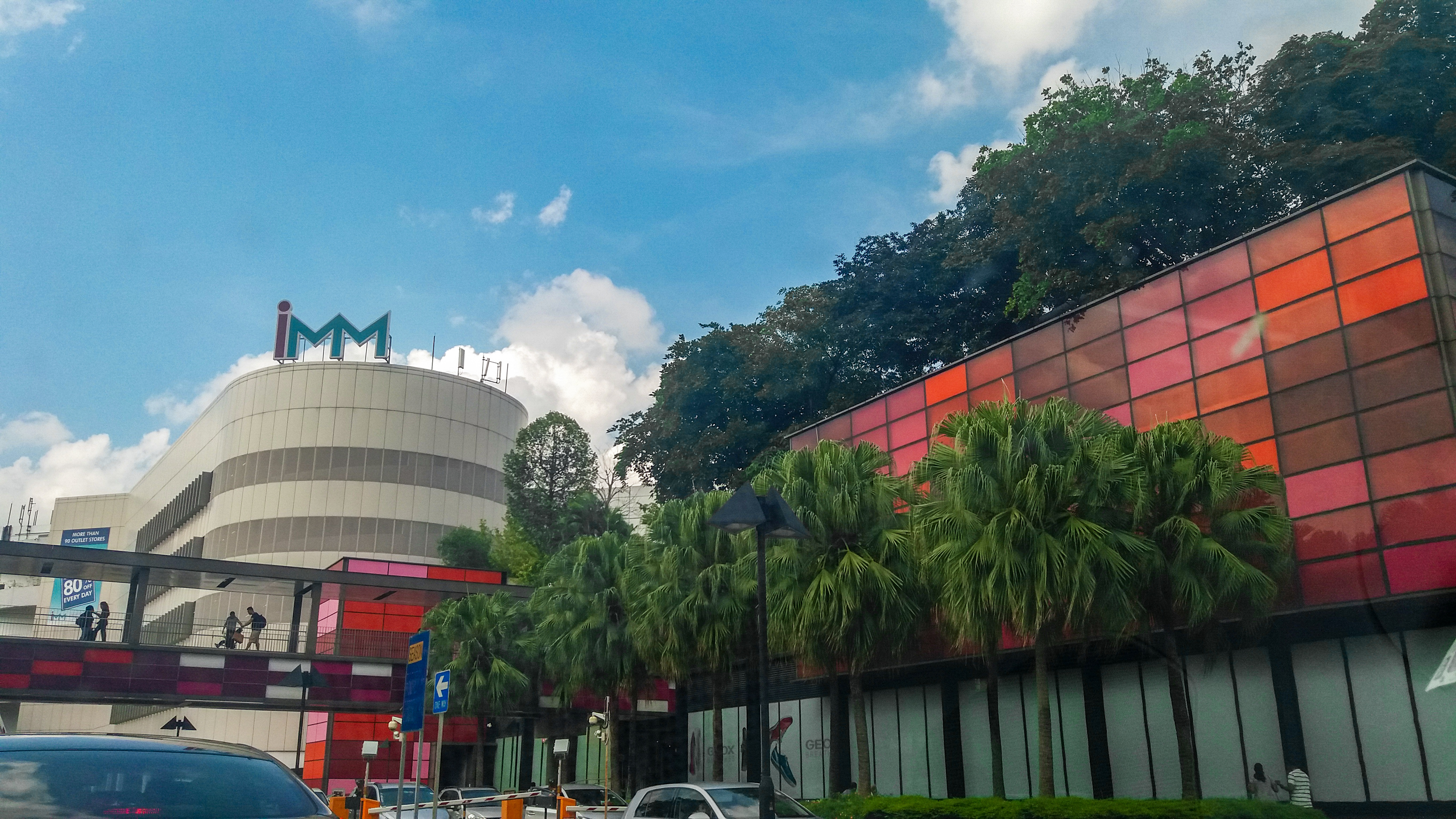
IMM Building after the 2012 renovation project.

The International Merchandising Mart Mall (usually referred to as IMM Mall) is an outlet mall owned by CapitaLand Mall Trust, located in Jurong East, Singapore. It is Singapore’s largest outlet mall with more than 100 outlet stores, offering up to 80% discount all year round. Opened in 1991, it is a five-storey mall with 961,281 square feet (89,305.9 m^{2}) of retail space. Besides retail stores, it also houses offices and warehouses for storage, which is advantageous in terms of cost efficiency to some retailers. The mall has capacity for 235 retail outlets and 430 non-retail outlets. Anchor tenants of the mall include Giant Hypermarket, Daiso department store and Best Denki.

== History ==
Originally owned by a group of Japanese investors including Yaohan and the Trade Development Board, IMM partially opened in May 1991 and planned to be fully operational by September 1991. It was touted to be one of the world's largest one-stop wholesale centres.

=== Renovation ===
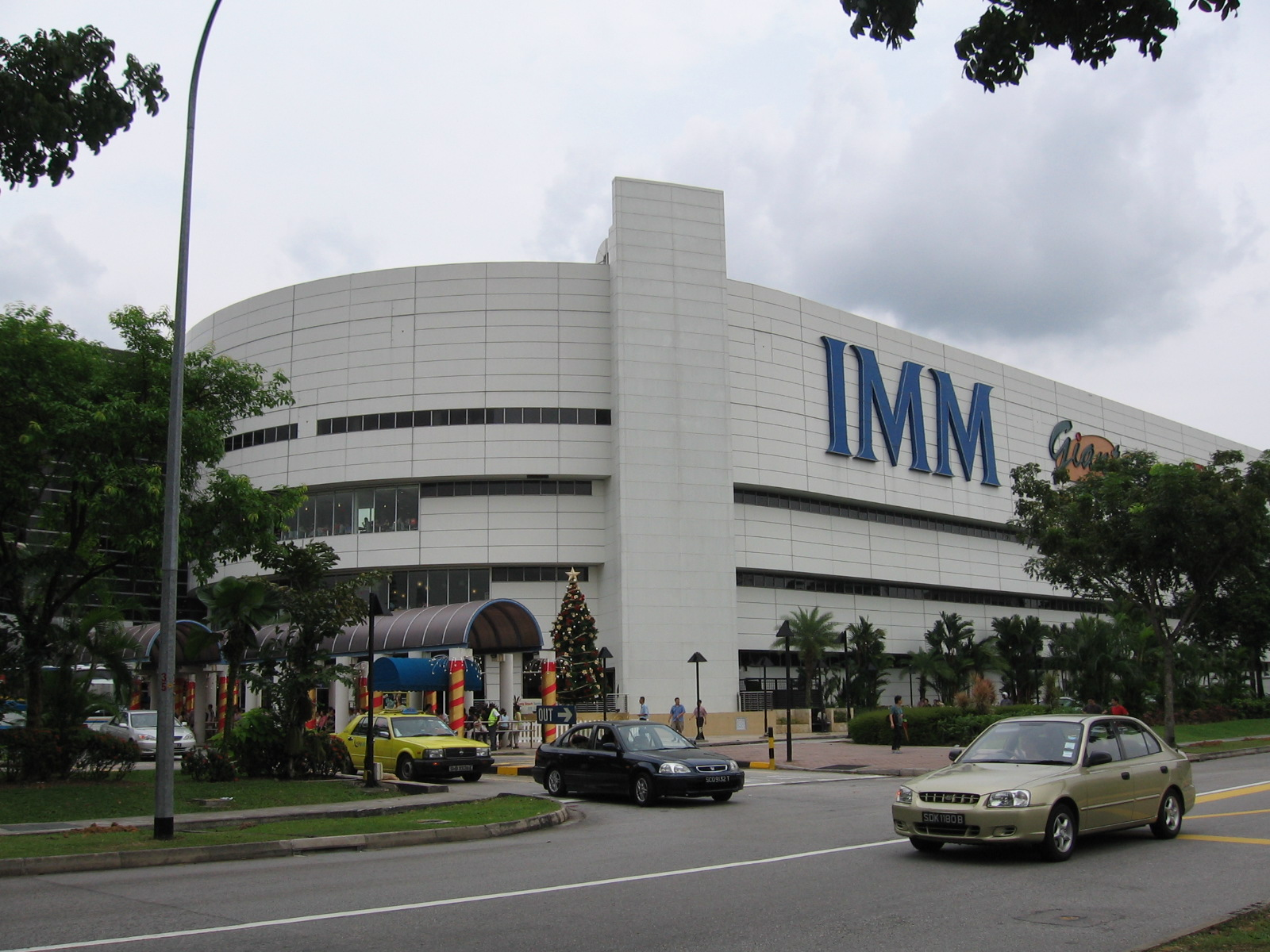
IMM Building before the 2012 renovation project.

In May 2012, IMM began a $30 million renovation project. The size of the building was increased and more stores were set up in the shopping centre.

In June 2024, IMM began another renovation project. Many shops such as Cotton On Outlet, were temporarily closed. Phase 1 reopened on 4 December 2024.
