= Sungei Jurong =

Jurong River
- Subzone of Jurong East Planning Area

Name transcription(s)
  - Malay: Sungei Jurong
- Location of Jurong River within Singapore
- Coordinates: 1°18′05″N 103°43′43″E
- Country: Singapore

Sungei Jurong (also known as the Jurong River) is a river in Jurong East, Singapore.

The Jurong River subzone runs across this river. The subzone is bounded by the Ayer Rajah Expressway, Jurong Port Road, Jalan Buroh and Penjuru Road.
