= Crest Secondary School =

School in Singapore

Coordinates: 1.3433°N 103.7428°E

- 561 Jurong East Street 24; 609561; Singapore

Information
- Type: Specialised school
- Opened: 2011
- Principal: Benjamin Kwok
- Website: www.crestsec.edu.sg

Crest Secondary School is a specialised school exclusively for Normal Technical (NT) students in Singapore. It offered both academic and vocational learning for students. It commenced its first year of operation in January 2013.

The school engages the NT students through a curriculum that largely integrates the academic learning often experienced in mainstream schools as well as the vocational training done in Singapore's Institute of Technical Education (ITE).

== Enrolment ==
Unlike the mainstream way of being posted to a shortlisted secondary school by the Ministry of Education (MOE), students must apply directly to Crest Secondary School after their Primary School Leaving Examination (PSLE).

== Curriculum ==
The school teaches subjects like Mathematics and Science at the NT level as well as skill-based subjects.

The school also provides an Industry Experiential Programme (IEP) for their secondary three students. It is a four-week work attachment for their vocational modules which leads to a ITE Skills Subject Certificate.

== Staff ==
The school's staff is not assigned by MOE but signed up to teach at the school.

=== Principal ===
- Frederick Yeo, 2012–2017
- Seet Tiat Hee, 2018–2023
- Benjamin Kwok, 2024–present
