= Boon Lay =

Boon Lay Place
- Subzone of Jurong West Planning Area & Housing Estate

Name transcription(s)
  - Chinese: 文礼/文禮
  - Pinyin: Wénlǐ
  - Hokkien POJ: Bûn-lé
  - Malay: Boon Lay
  - Tamil: பூன் லே
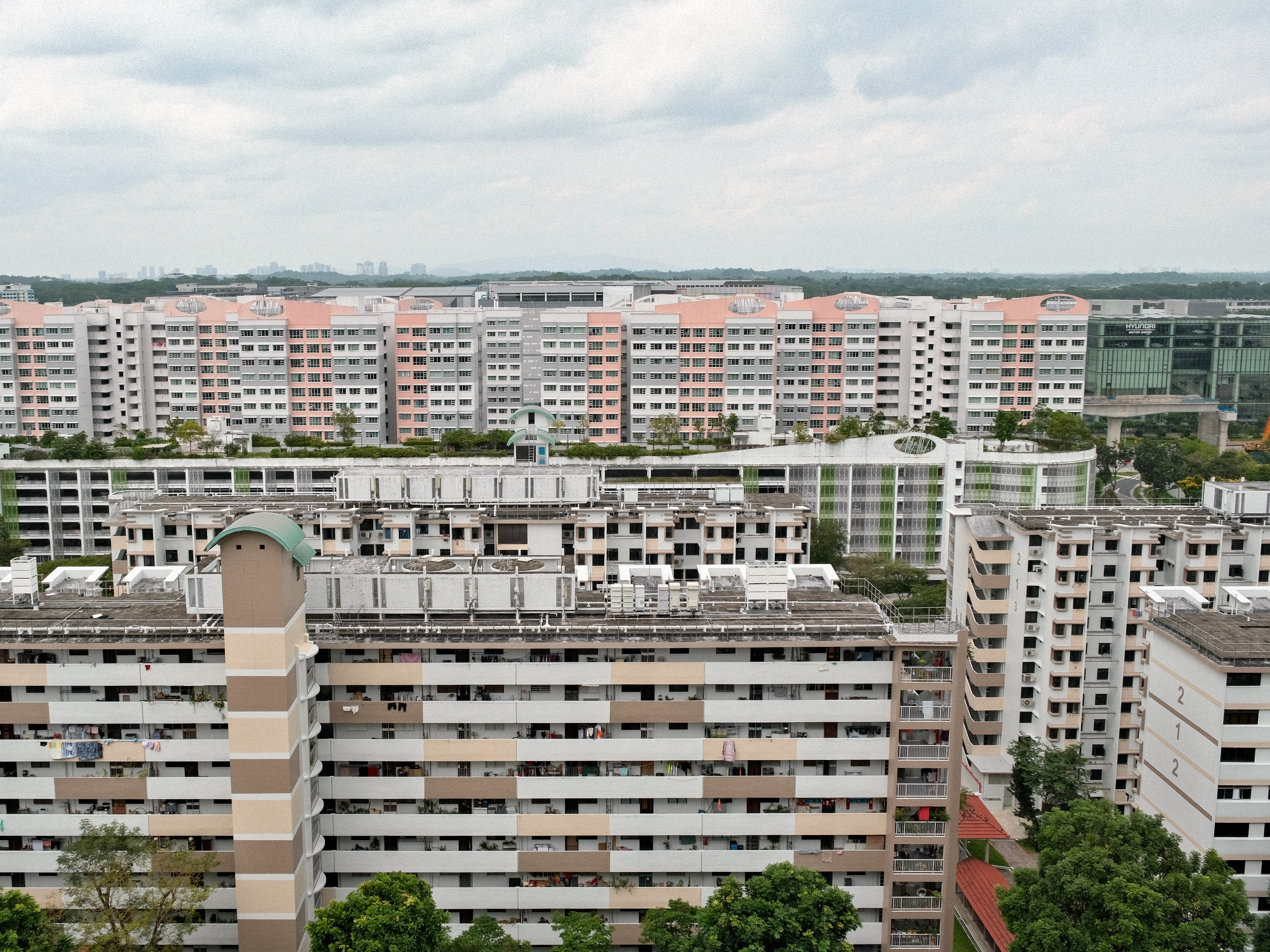
- HDB flats at Boon Lay Place

- Location of Boon Lay Place within Singapore
- Coordinates: 1°20′45.29″N 103°42′41.85″E
- Country: Singapore

Area
  - Total: 0.9063 km^{2} (0.3499 sq mi)

Population (2026)
  - Total: 29,360
  - Density: 32,400/km^{2} (83,900/sq mi)

Boon Lay (simplified Chinese: 文礼; traditional Chinese: 文禮, Tamil: பூன் லே) is a neighbourhood located in the town of Jurong West in the West Region of Singapore. Its borders very roughly correspond to the URA subzone of Boon Lay Place, situated within the Jurong West Planning Area.

== Etymology and history ==
The subzone was named after Chew Boon Lay (Chinese: 周文禮; Pe̍h-ōe-jī: Chiu Bûn-lé), a prominent businessman from Zhangzhou, China, who in the late 19th century and early 20th century owned the land where the precinct stands. Boon Lay and Jurong West were once collectively known as Peng Kang (Chinese: 秉江; Pe̍h-ōe-jī: péng-kang), derived from the Hokkien term for the processing of gambier. In the 19th century, the gambier and rubber plantations in the area played a key role in attracting new settlers.

The War Department of the colonial government of Singapore made a requisition of 1.012 km^{2} (0.391 sq mi) of land from his estate and the land was subsequently named Boon Lay after Chew. This led to the growth of Boon Lay Village in the 1940s, with a population of about 420 in the early 1960s. Boon Lay Place had earthworks begun in 1969 and had their HDB flats built since 1974.

== Residential Areas ==
The only private estate in the precinct is Summerdale, while the rest consists of estates built by the government.

Street	Block number
Boon Lay Avenue	185–187, 216A-216B, 217A-217B, 218A-218D
Boon Lay Drive	167–172, 174–179, 180A-180C, 181A-181B, 183A-183D, 188–191, 196A-196B, 197A-197D, 198–206, 237A-B, 238A-B, 239A-B, 257–261, 262–267
Boon Lay Place	221, 207–209, 210–215

- those in italic are HDB's Built-To-Order(BTO) flats which are currently under construction.

== Transportation ==
=== Roads ===
The main roads in the precinct are Jalan Boon Lay, Boon Lay Way, Corporation Road and Jurong West Avenue 2, which bounds the precinct and connects it to the rest of the island through linking with the PIE (exits 34 and 36), with minor roads (Boon Lay Avenue, Boon Lay Drive and Boon Lay Place) winding through the various estates in the precinct.

=== Public transport ===
==== Connection to MRT ====
The precinct is situated between Boon Lay and Lakeside stations. Connection to both stations is available through feeder bus services 240 and 246 and to Boon Lay through trunk bus services 174 and 198. Trunk bus services 30, 154, 178, 180 and 187 are also available along Boon Lay Way of the Southern boundary, depending on direction of travel.

==== Connection to other areas ====
- Connection to Nanyang, Gek Poh Ville, Hong Kah, Yuhua, Joo Koon and Clementi is available through trunk bus service 99.
- Connection to Pioneer, Hong Kah, Yuhua, NUH, One-North, Buona Vista, Tanglin Halt, Queenstown and Bukit Merah is available through trunk bus service 198.
- Connection to Pioneer, Bukit Batok, Bukit Timah, Holland Village and the city is available through trunk bus service 174.
- Connection to Pioneer, Gek Poh and Joo Koon is available through trunk bus service 258M on weekend and public holiday mornings.
- Direct connection to the city is available through express bus service 502.

=== Interstate bus services ===
In addition to local buses, Malaysian Inter-State Express Buses start off from the former Savoy cinema to specific destinations in Malaysia as an alternative to the bus terminals located downtown such as those at Kallang Bahru Bus Terminal and Golden Mile Shopping Centre. Tickets can be bought from ticket agents at Boon Lay Shopping Centre.

== Schools ==
There is one primary school (Boon Lay Garden Primary School), two secondary schools (Boon Lay Secondary School and River Valley High) and many childcare centres in the precinct.

== Politics ==
The subzone is under the jurisdiction of two divisions, of West Coast-Jurong West Group Representation Constituency (previously called West Coast Group Representation Constituency prior to 2025) and the smaller Pioneer constituency, both under the management of West Coast-Jurong West Town Council. The people living there are represented by Desmond Lee and Patrick Tay, respectively. Lawrence Wong, the current Prime Minister of Singapore, was previously the MP under the Boon Lay division during his first term in 2011, before he left in 2015 to lead his team in Marsiling-Yew Tee.

== Other facilities ==
The town centre is located at Boon Lay Place. It is accessible from all parts of the precinct through feeder bus service 240 and 246 and trunk bus service 99.

There are 2 churches (The Church of Saint Francis of Assisi and Jurong Church of Christ) and 1 Chinese temple known as Tuas Pek Kong Keng Temple (大士伯公宫) in the precinct and all of them are found in the town centre.

There is a Boon Lay Hawker at the town centre where local food can be found.

The precinct's community centre (Boon Lay Community Centre) is located at the junction of Boon Lay Place and Boon Lay Avenue, as part of the town centre. It was upgraded from 2010 to 2011.

=== Boon Lay Shopping Centre ===
Managed by HDB, this is the shopping centre that caters mainly to the residents of Boon Lay Place. An anchor tenant in this shopping centre is NTUC Fairprice. The shopping centre has been upgraded with new facilities likes elevators and escalators since late 2012.
