= Benoi Sector =

- Subzone of Pioneer Planning Area

Name transcription(s)
  - Chinese: 贲耐
  - Pinyin: Bēnnài
  - Malay: Benoi
  - Tamil: பினொய்
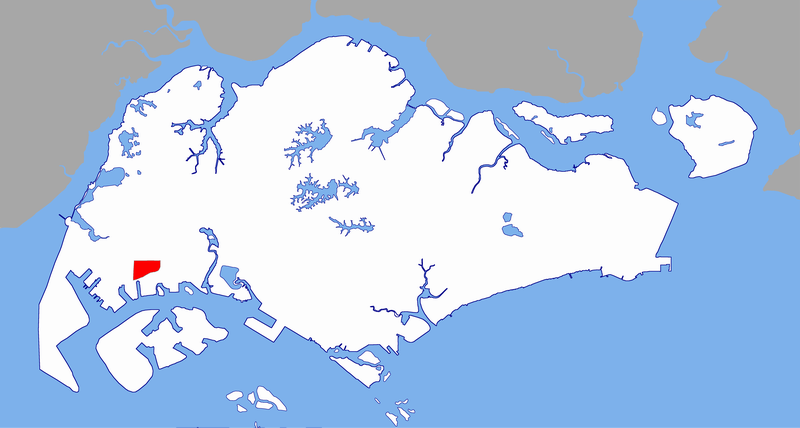
- Benoi location
- Coordinates: 1.317°N 103.686°E
- Country: Singapore
- Planning Area: Pioneer Planning Area

Benoi Sector is an industrial area in the Western region of Singapore within Jurong Industrial Estate. West of Benoi is Gul and east of Benoi is the Jurong Bird Park. Several shipyards and oil refineries are located in the south of Benoi.

It is bounded by Jalan Ahmad Ibrahim, Benoi Road, and Pioneer Road.

== History ==
In July 2024, a major traffic accident occurred between several vehicles outside the Benoi industrial estate access road, with some 18 persons requiring hospitalisation.

== Industry and major landmarks ==
In production since 1963, Chong Cheong is a large pipe production and foundry works in Benoi.

The industrial estate has a 92,463 sqm five story logistics hub. PIL logistics has a 130,000 sq feet distribution centre in Benoi with a storage capacity of 20,000 pallets.

Pall Corporation have a factory in Benoi.

Surrounding Benoi Industrial Estate are Exxon Mobil Refinery and Keppel Shipyard. To the south-west is the PUB Jurong Water Reclamation Plant.

== Mass Rapid Transit ==
Joo Koon MRT station is located at Joo Koon Circle along Benoi Road and International Road.
