= Tukang MRT station =

Future Mass Rapid Transit station in Singapore

Tukang JS10 都康 துக்காங்
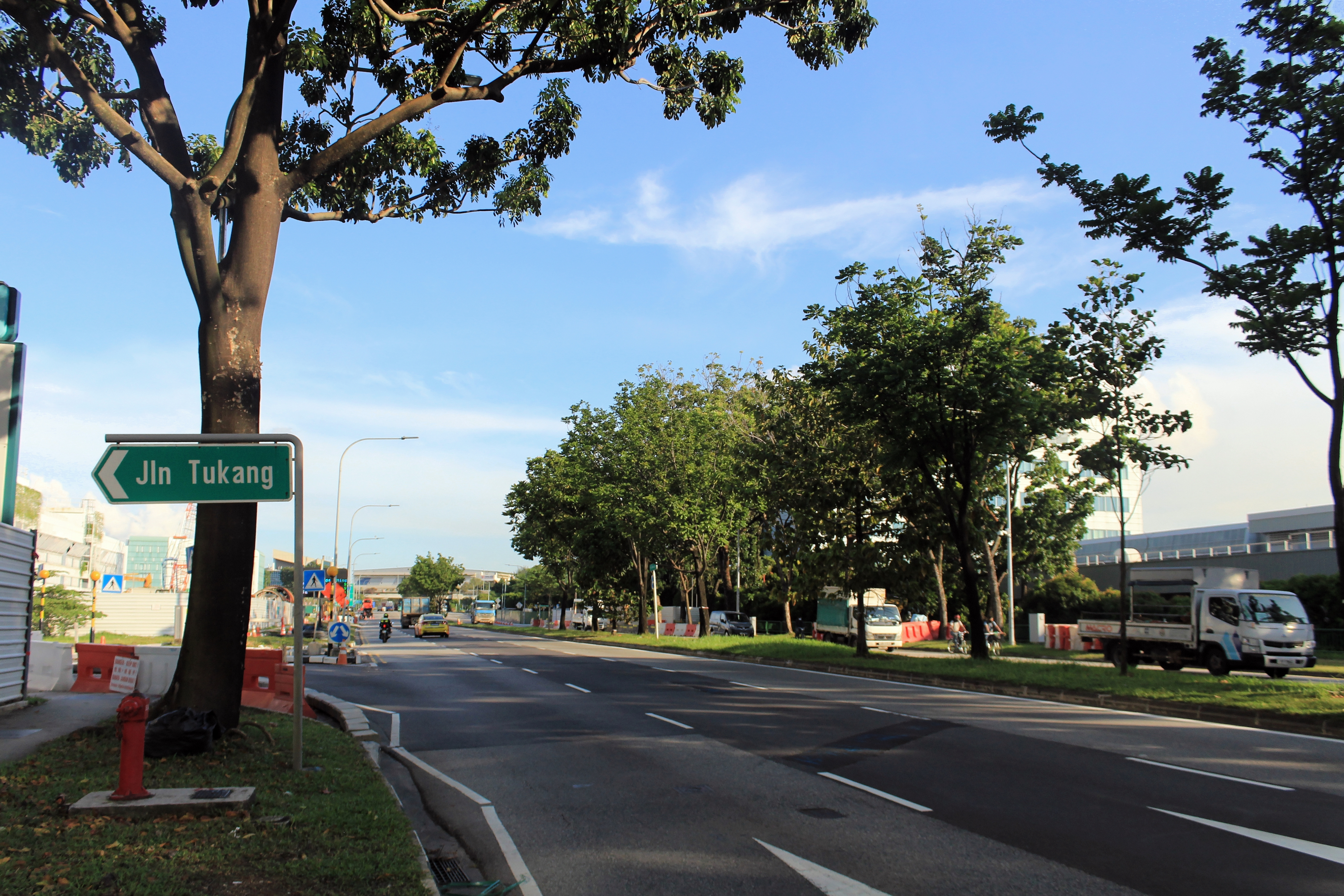
- Tukang MRT station site

General information
- Coordinates: 01°19′31″N 103°42′33″E
- System: Future Mass Rapid Transit (MRT) station
- Owner: Land Transport Authority
- Operator: Singapore One Rail
- Line: Jurong Region Line
- Platforms: 2 (1 island platform)
- Tracks: 2
- Connections: Bus, Taxi

Construction
- Structure type: Elevated
- Platform levels: 1
- Parking: Yes
- Cycle facilities: Yes
- Accessible: Yes

Other information
- Station code: TKG

History
- Opening: 2029; 3 years' time

Services
Preceding station	Mass Rapid Transit	Following station
Enterprise towards Peng Kang Hill	Jurong Region Line Future service	Jurong Hill towards Jurong Pier
Location
- Location within Singapore Rail

Tukang MRT station is a future elevated Mass Rapid Transit (MRT) station on the Jurong Region Line in Boon Lay, Singapore. The name is derived from the road nearby, Jalan Tukang.

== History ==
On 9 May 2018, LTA announced that Tukang station would be part of the proposed Jurong Region Line (JRL). The station will be constructed as part of Phase 3, consisting of a total of 7 stations. A 4 station extension to Jurong Pier at Boon Lay and a 3 station extension to Peng Kang Hill from Tawas. It is expected to be completed in 2029.

A contract to design and construct Tukang Station and its associated viaducts was awarded to China Harbour (Singapore) Engineering Company Pte. Ltd. on 12 May 2021 at a sum of S$241 million (US$176.66 million). Construction will start in May 2021, with completion in 2029.

Initially expected to open in 2028, the restrictions on the construction due to the COVID-19 pandemic has led to delays in the JRL line completion, and the date was pushed to 2029.

== Location ==
The station complex will be straddled over the existing Jalan Boon Lay, at the junction with Jalan Tukang, just south of the junction with International Road. It is located within the Boon Lay planning area in the Tukang Subzone, serving the nearby industrial areas and the JTC MedTech Park.

Access to the station will be via 4 exits total, with 2 on each side of Jalan Boon Lay.
