= Jurong station =

Jurong station may refer to multiple different Mass Rapid Transit (MRT) train stations in Singapore:

- Jurong East MRT station
- Jurong Lake District MRT station
- Jurong Town Hall MRT station
- Jurong Hill MRT station

== See also ==
- Jurong railway station (China)
