= West Region, Singapore =

West Region
- Region

Other transcription(s)
  - Malay: Wilayah Barat (Singapura)
  - Chinese: 西区 (新加坡)
  - Tamil: மேற்குப் பகுதி (சிங்கப்பூர்)
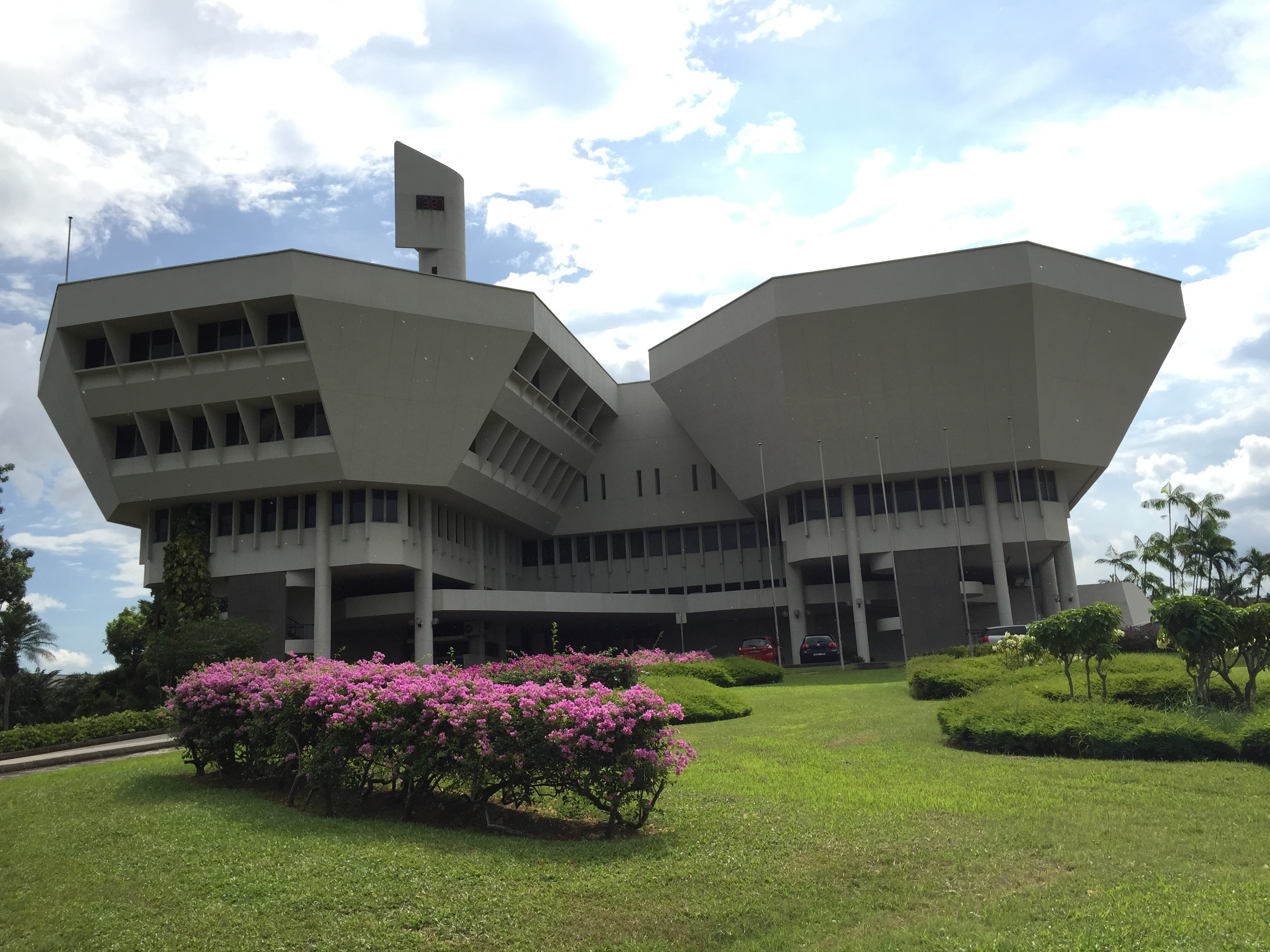
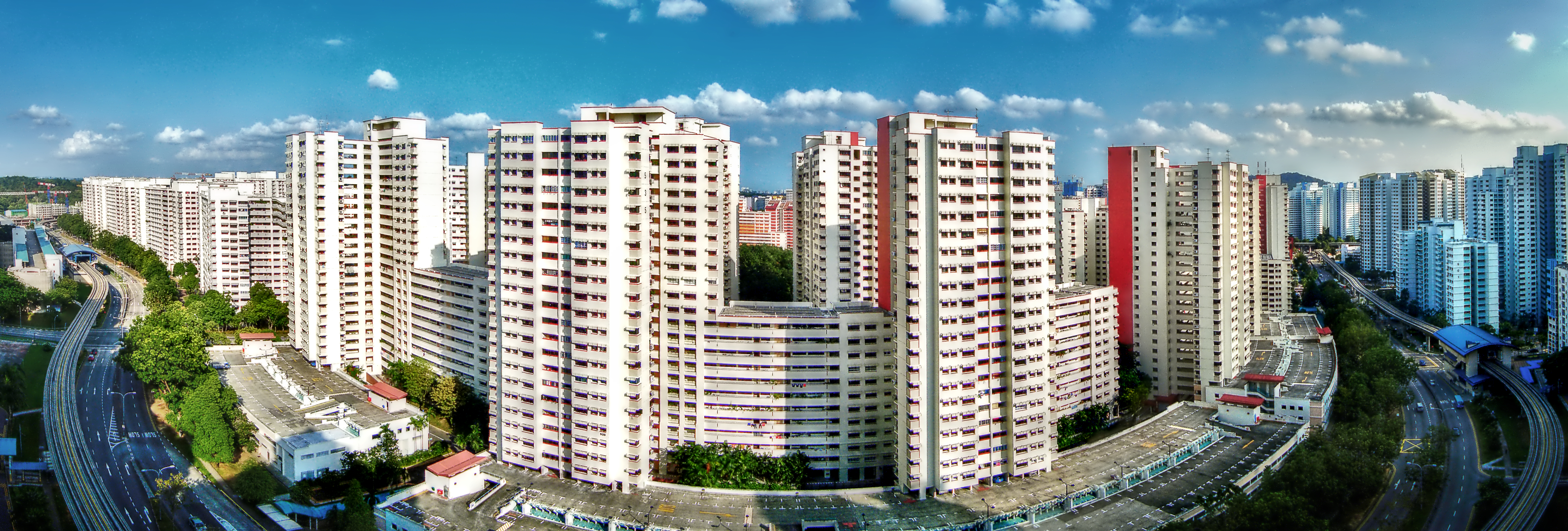
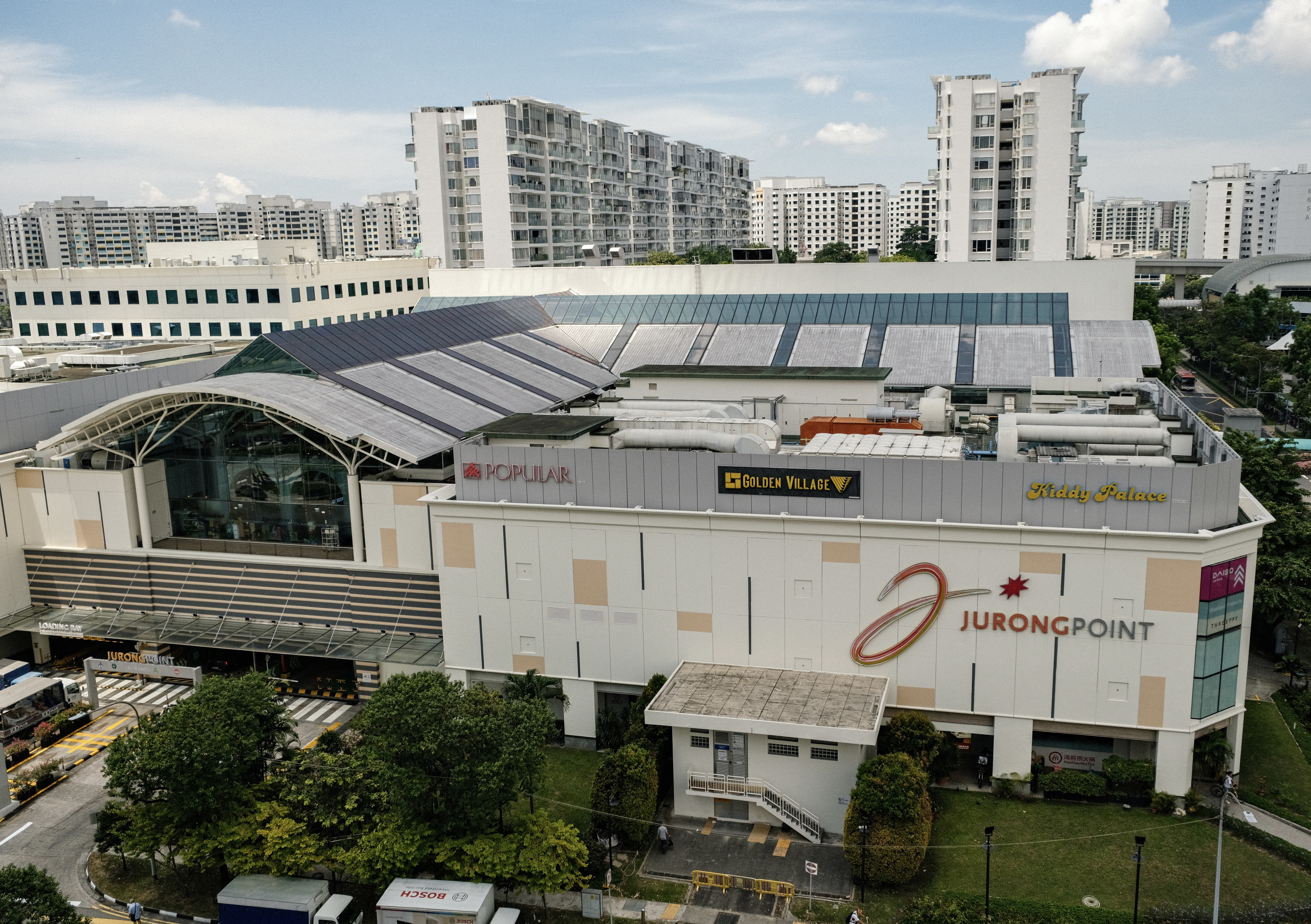
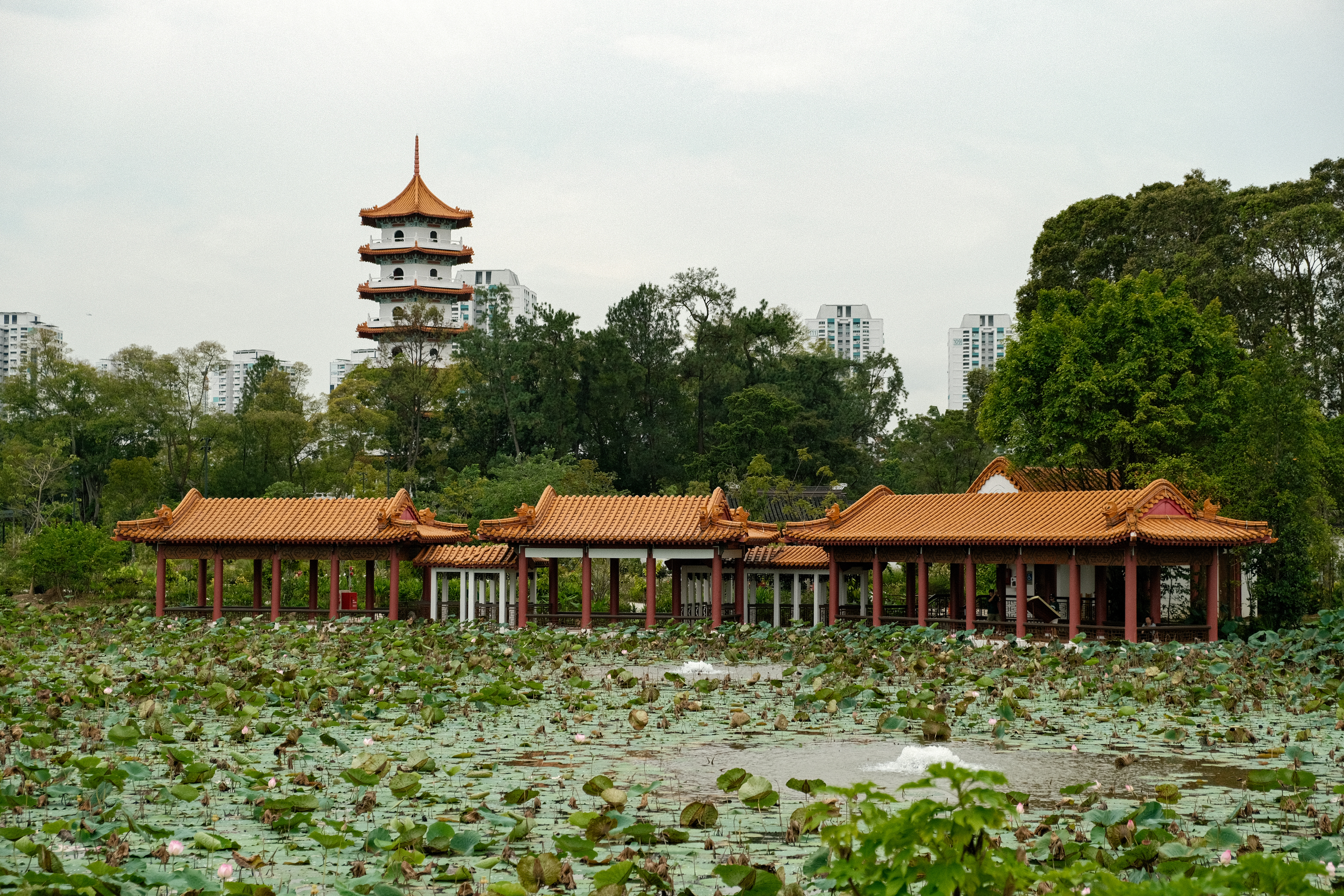
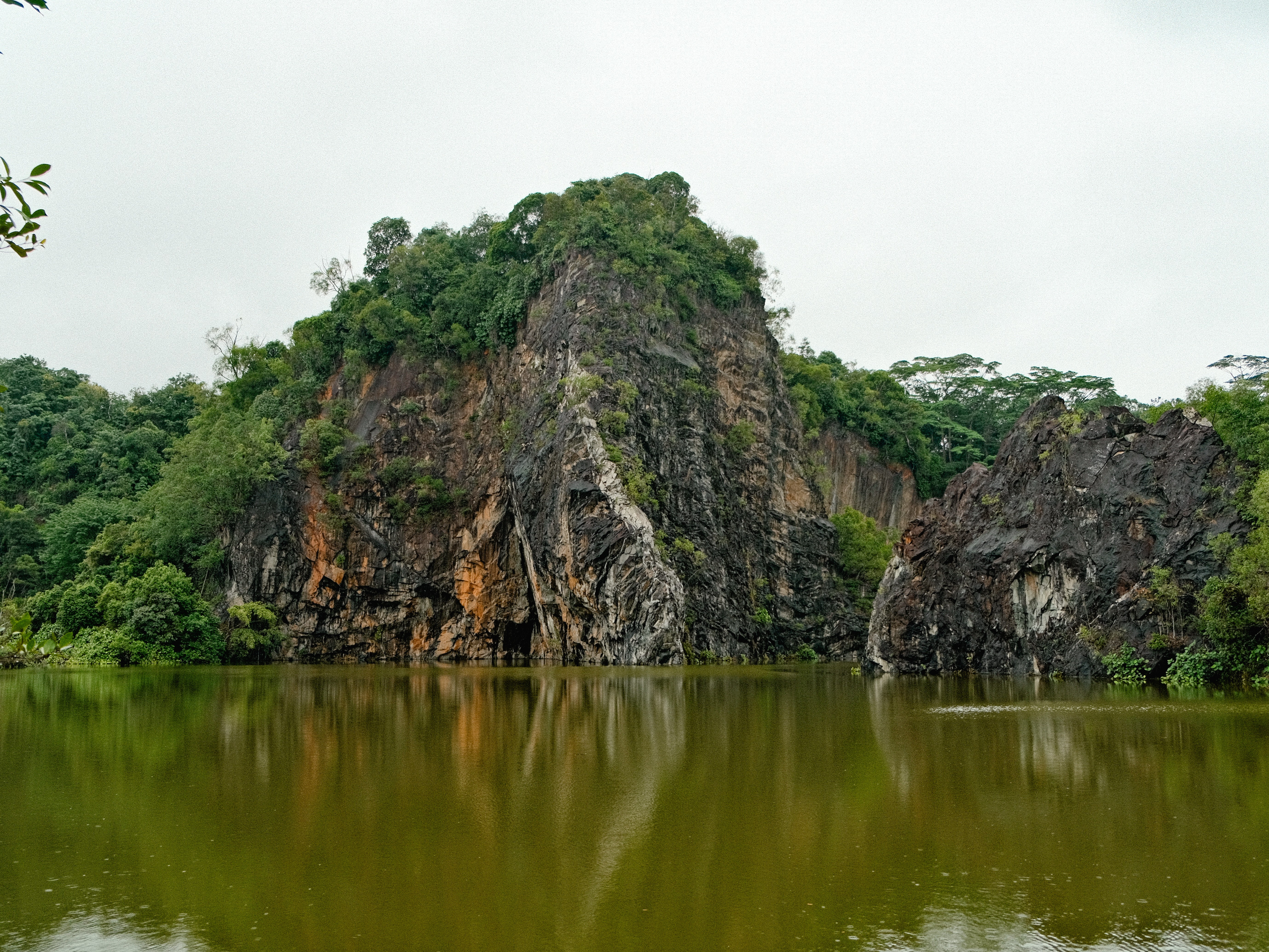
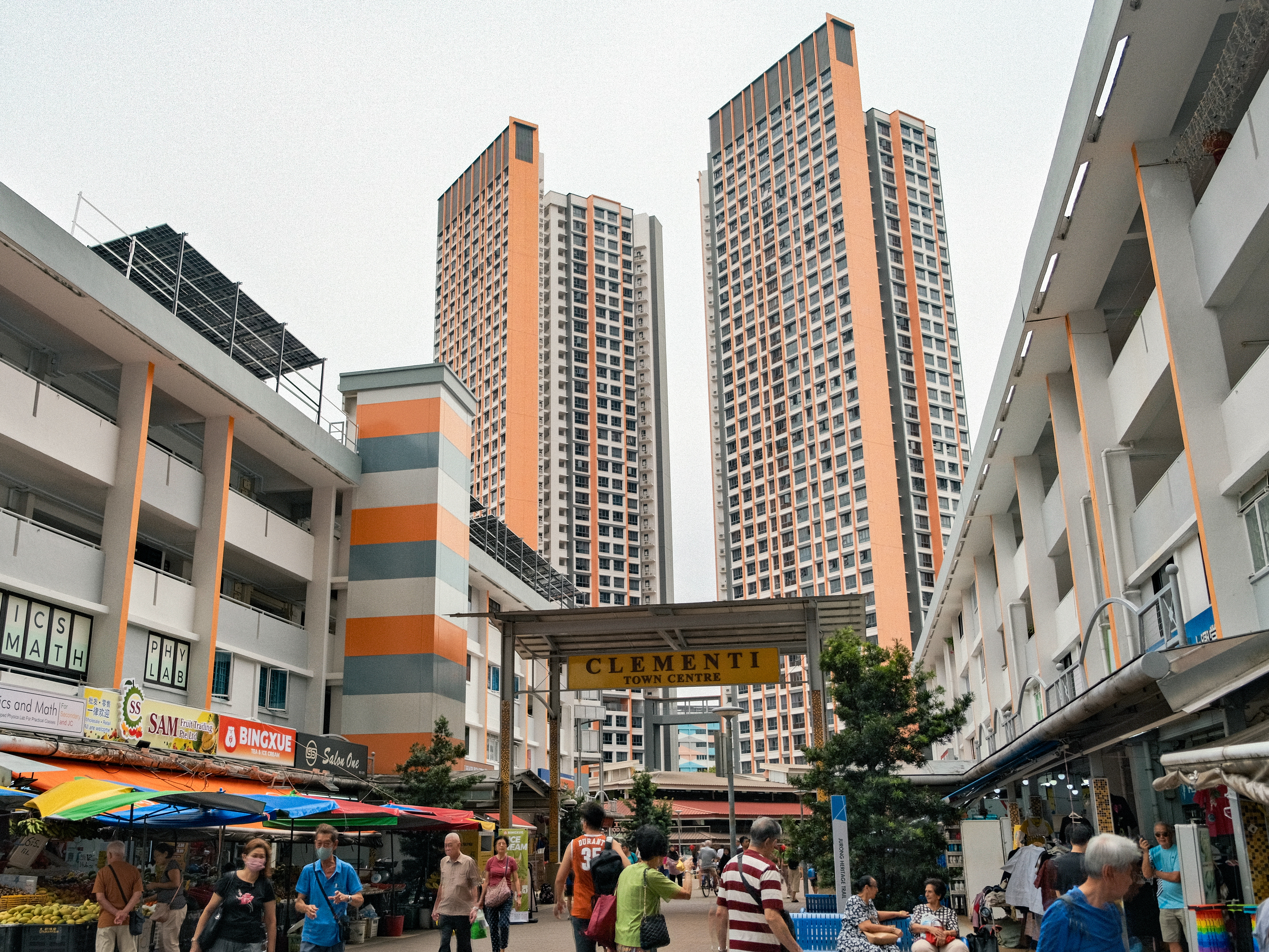
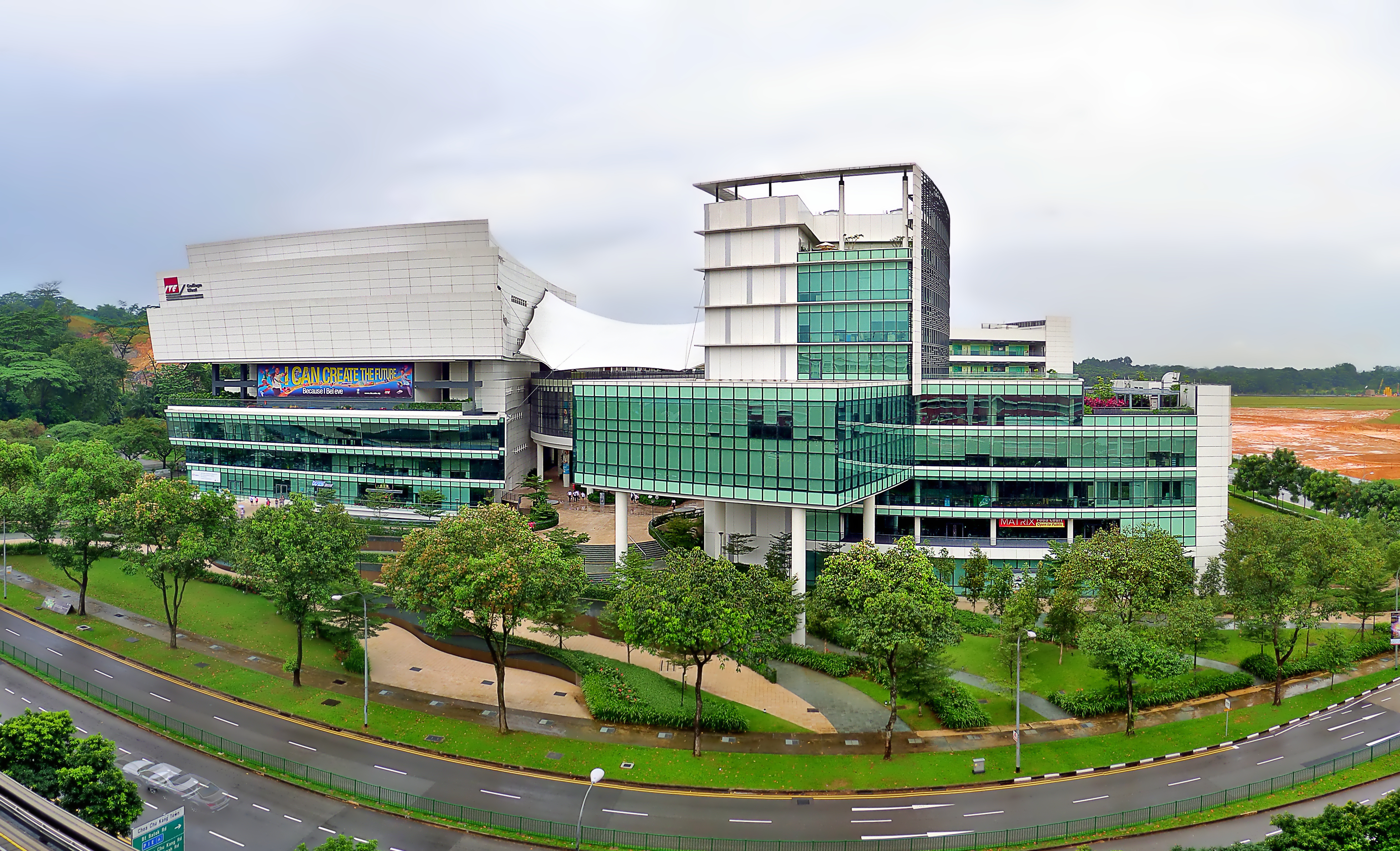
- From top left to right: Jurong Town Hall, HDB flats in Bukit Panjang, Jurong Point, Chinese Garden, Bukit Batok Town Park, Clementi Town Centre, ITE College West

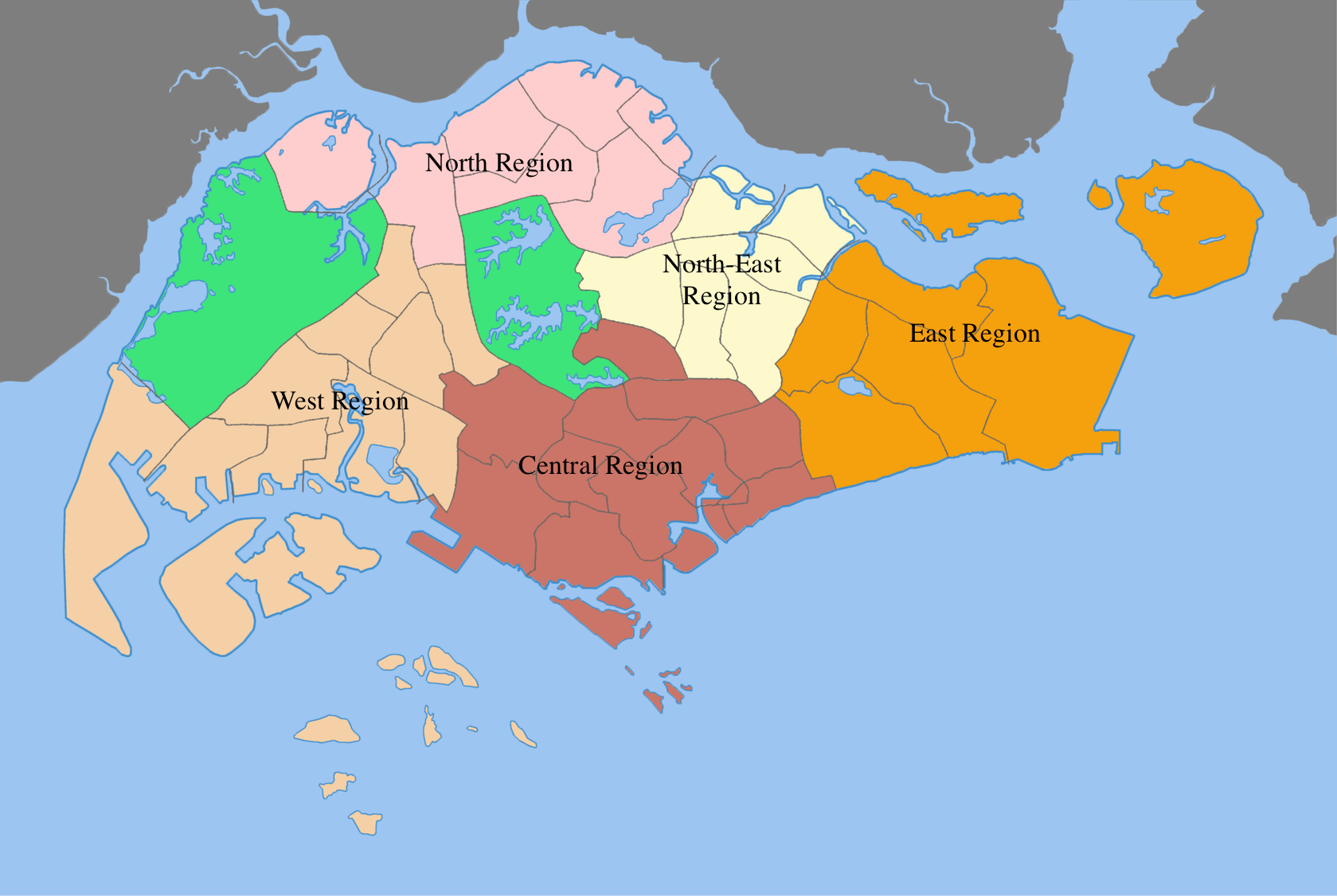
- Coordinates: 1°19′43.98″N 103°44′23.81″E
- Country: Singapore
- Planning areas: 12: Bukit Batok; Bukit Panjang; Boon Lay; Pioneer; Choa Chu Kang; Clementi; Jurong East; Jurong West; Tengah; Tuas; Western Islands; Western Water Catchment
- CDC: North West CDC; South West CDC
- Regional centre: Jurong East
- Largest PA: Jurong West

Government
  - Mayors: North West CDC: Alex Yam; South West CDC: Low Yen Ling

Area
  - Total: 201.3 km^{2} (77.7 sq mi)

Population (2020)
  - Total: 922,540
  - Density: 4,583/km^{2} (11,870/sq mi)

The West Region is one of the five regions in the city-state of Singapore. The region is the largest in terms of land area and is the third most populous region after the North-East Region and Central Region. Jurong East is the regional centre of the region, with plans of developing the Jurong Lake District into a second CBD area. Jurong West is the most populous town in the region, with a population of 262,730 residents. Comprising 25,500 hectares of land area, it includes twelve planning areas and is home to about 922,540 residents.

== Geography ==
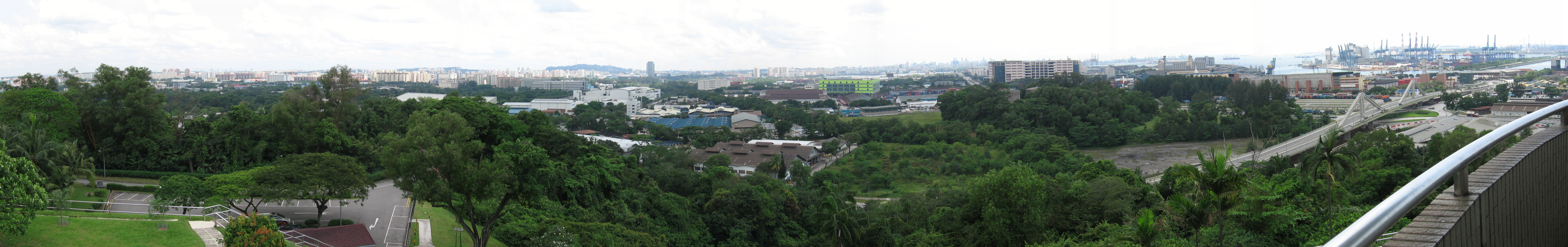
Panoramic view of parts of the West Region in 2006, from the look-out tower on Jurong Hill. Jurong Industrial Estate lies in the foreground.

With a total land area of 201.3 km^{2} (77.7 sq mi), the region is situated on the western corner of Singapore Island, bordering the North Region to the north and east, Central Region to the south-east and the Straits of Johor to the west. The region is largely made up of residential towns and established industrial estates. Located at the southernmost part of the region, far away from the main residential and commercial areas, Jurong Island and Tuas house a majority of Singapore's heavy industries.

== Government ==
The region is locally governed by two different Community Development Councils, namely the North West CDC and South West CDC, and is divided into 12 planning areas.

=== Planning Areas ===
| Planning Area | Area (km^{2}') | Population | Density (/km^{2}') |
|---|---|---|---|
| Boon Lay | 8.23 | 1000 | 3.6 |
| Bukit Batok | 11.13 | 139,270 | 12,513 |
| Bukit Panjang | 8.99 | 139,030 | 15,466.7 |
| Choa Chu Kang | 6.11 | 174,330 | 28,513.2 |
| Clementi | 9.49 | 91,630 | 9,650.3 |
| Jurong East | 17.83 | 84,980 | 4,766.9 |
| Jurong West | 14.69 | 272,660 | 18,563.5 |
| Pioneer | 12.1 | 100 | 8.3 |
| Tengah | 7.4 | 10 | 1.4 |
| Tuas | 30.04 | 70 | 2.3 |
| Western Islands | 39.47 | 0 | 0 |
| Western Water Catchment | 69.46 | 900 | 13 |

=== Other major areas ===
- Jurong Lake
- Buona Vista
- Ghim Moh
- Holland Village
- Pandan Gardens
- Jurong Island
- Kent Ridge
- Nanyang
- Pioneer
- Pasir Laba
- Teban Gardens
- Toh Tuck
- Tuas South
- West Coast
- Dover
- Gul Circle

== Economy ==
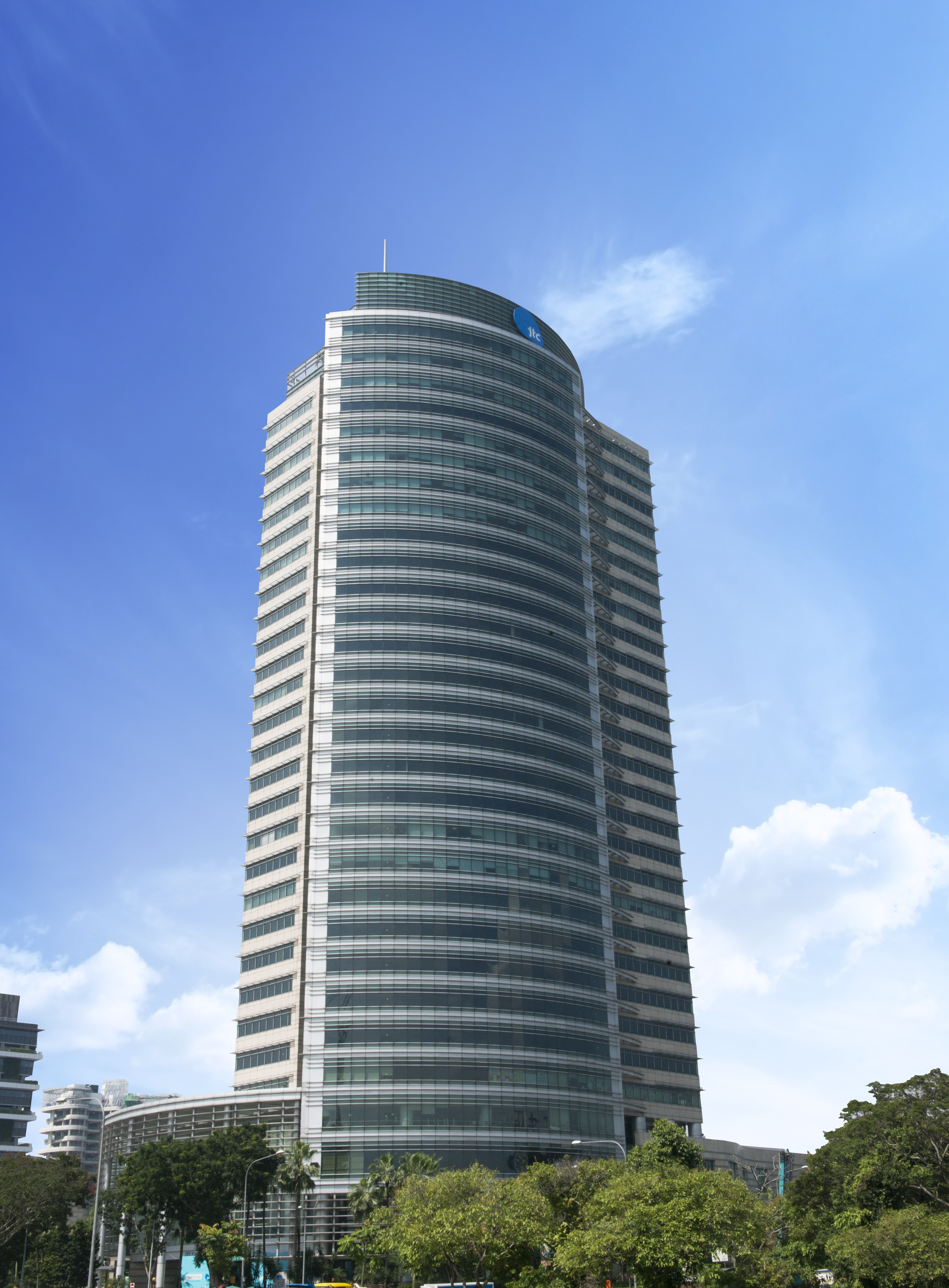
The JTC Summit of JTC Corporation currently stands as the tallest building outside the Central Region of Singapore.

The West Region is home to a majority of Singapore's heavy industries, mainly the petrochemical industry, with international oil and gas and chemicals companies, such as LANXESS, Afton Chemical, BASF, BP, Celanese, Evonik, ExxonMobil, DuPont, Mitsui Chemicals, Chevron Oronite, Shell, Singapore Petroleum Company and Sumitomo Chemical operating facilities on Jurong Island and Pulau Bukom. The area makes up about 5% of Singapore's GDP and top three export refining centres in the world, with the world's seventh largest oil refinery.

Sungei Tengah, located within the Western Water Catchment area, is one of Singapore’s rural farming districts and supports agricultural activities such as food production, aquaculture, ornamental fish breeding, and agri-food technology development.

A second Central Business District is also planned to be developed in the Jurong Lake District, with the Kuala Lumpur–Singapore High Speed Rail terminus supposed to be located there, before the project was indefinitely postponed.

== Education ==
Residents of the area have access to different educational facilities ranging from pre-schools to primary and secondary schools, as these are located around the different towns in the West region. The area is also home to various tertiary institutions, such as APSN Delta Senior School, ITE College West, Jurong Junior College, Millennia Institute, Nanyang Technological University, National University of Singapore, Ngee Ann Polytechnic, NUS High School of Math and Science, Pioneer Junior College, River Valley High School, Singapore University of Social Sciences, School of Science and Technology, Singapore Polytechnic, Singapore Hotel and Tourism Education Centre, and Grace Orchard School (a special education school).
