= Joo Koon =

- Subzone of Pioneer Planning Area

Other transcription(s)
  - Chinese: 裕群; Yùqún (Pinyin); Jū-kûn (Hokkien POJ)
  - Malay: Joo Koon
  - Tamil: ஜூ கூன் Jū kūṉ (Transliteration)
- Joo Koon MRT station

- Joo Koon's location in Singapore
- Coordinates: 1.325°N 103.68°E
- Country: Singapore
- Planning Area: Pioneer Planning Area

Joo Koon (裕群) is a subzone of Pioneer, Singapore. East of Joo Koon is Lok Yang and South is Gul. Joo Koon consists mostly of factories.

It is bounded by Upper Jurong Road, the Pan Island Expressway, Jalan Ahmad Ibrahim and Benoi Road.

== Amenities and landmarks ==
Surrounding Joo Koon industrial town are Pasir Laba Camp, SISPEC, SAFTI, Jurong Camp, Singapore Discovery Centre and Arena Country Club.

There is a food centre located along Joo Koon Way. There is also a NTUC FairPrice Warehouse Club, office units all comes under one roof at FairPrice Hub Joo Koon, which is the town hub.

== Residential ==
There is a dormitory called Jurong Apartments located near Joo Koon MRT Station.

== Transportation ==
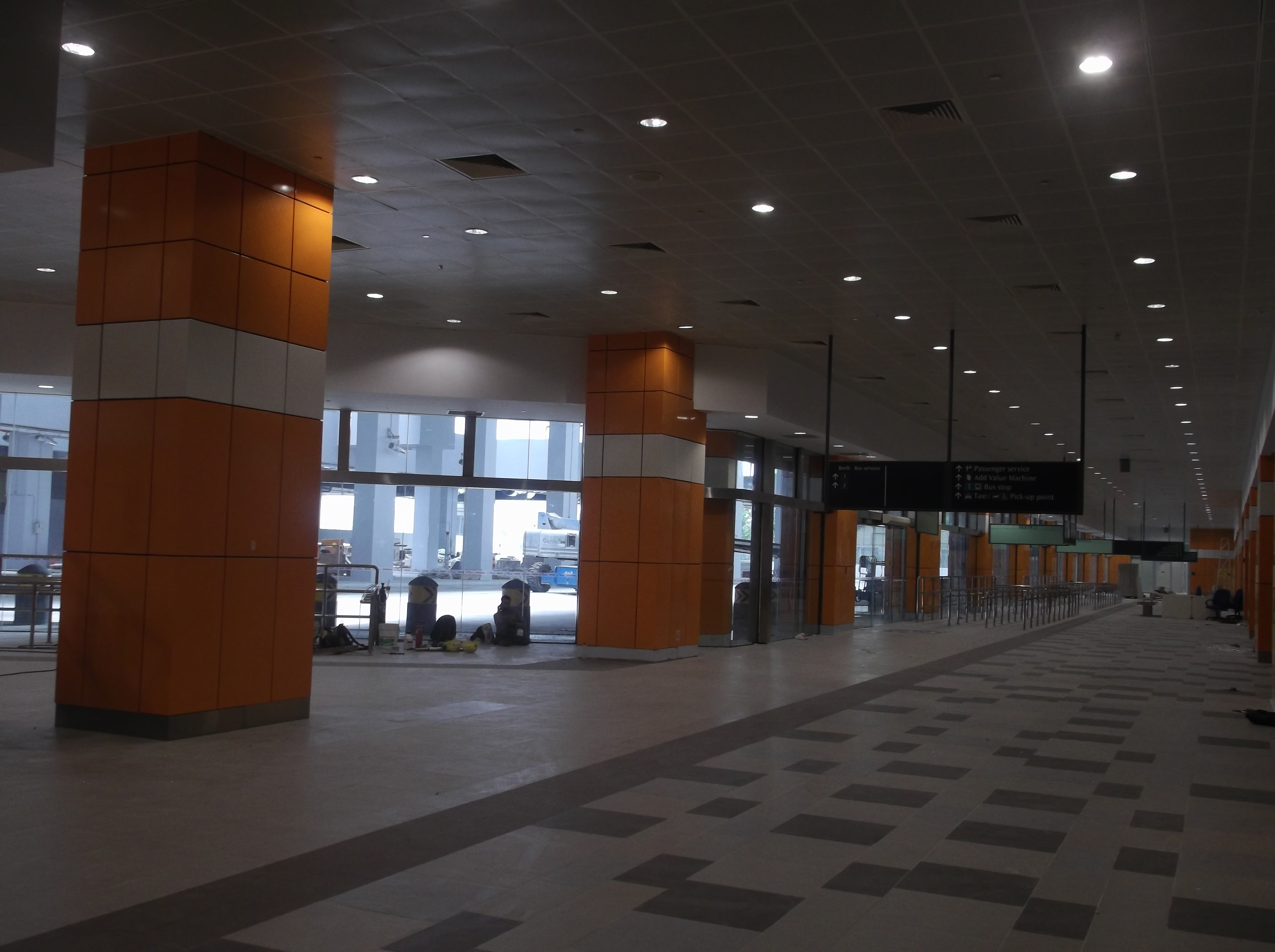
Joo Koon Bus Interchange.

Joo Koon MRT station is located at Joo Koon Circle in the eastern side of the industrial estate.

Joo Koon Bus Interchange was opened on 21 November 2015.
