= Jurong Hill MRT station =

Future Mass Rapid Transit station in Singapore

Jurong Hill JS11 裕廊山 ஜூரோங் ஹில்
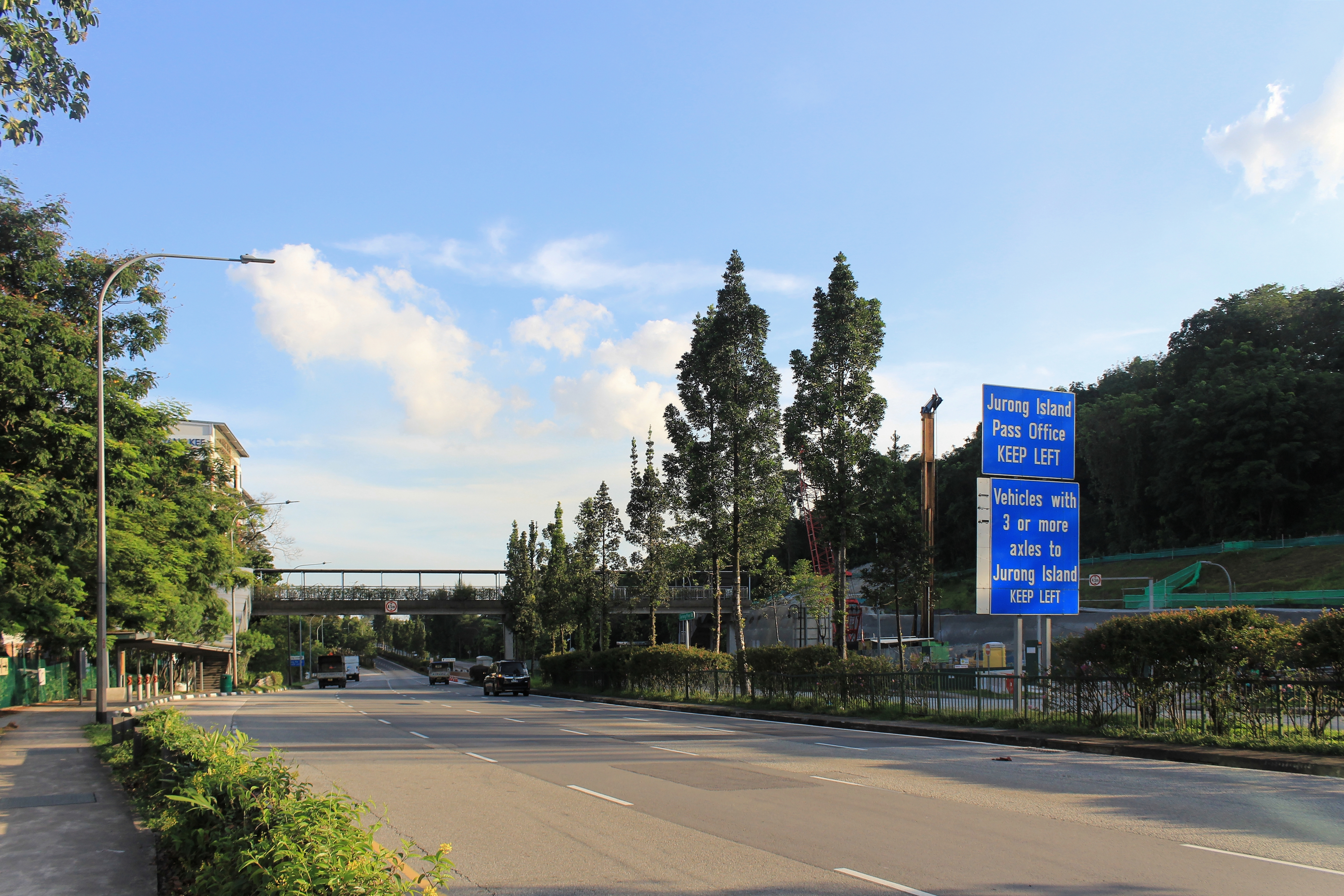
- Jurong Hill MRT station site

General information
- Coordinates: 01°19′07″N 103°42′37″E
- System: Future Mass Rapid Transit (MRT) station
- Owner: Land Transport Authority
- Operator: Singapore One Rail
- Line: Jurong Region Line
- Platforms: 2 (2 side platforms)
- Tracks: 2
- Connections: Bus, Taxi

Construction
- Structure type: Elevated
- Platform levels: 1
- Parking: Yes
- Cycle facilities: Yes
- Accessible: Yes

Other information
- Station code: JRH

History
- Opening: 2029; 3 years' time

Services
Preceding station	Mass Rapid Transit	Following station
Tukang towards Peng Kang Hill	Jurong Region Line Future service	Jurong Pier Terminus
Location
- Location within Singapore Rail

Jurong Hill MRT station is a future elevated Mass Rapid Transit (MRT) station on the Jurong Region Line (JRL) in Boon Lay, Singapore. First announced in May 2018, the station is expected to be completed in 2029 along with Phase 3 of JRL.

== History ==
On 9 May 2018, the Land Transport Authority (LTA) announced that Jurong Hill station would be part of the proposed Jurong Region Line (JRL). The station will be constructed as part of Phase 3, consisting of 7 stations – a 4 station extension to Jurong Pier station from Boon Lay and a 3 station extension to Peng Kang Hill from Tawas. It was expected to be completed in 2028. However, the restrictions on construction due to the COVID-19 pandemic has led to delays, with the completion date pushed to 2029.

The contract for the design and construction of the Jurong Hill and Jurong Pier stations and 1.1 km (0.68 miles) of associated viaducts – Contract J112 – was awarded to a joint venture between China Civil Engineering Construction Corporation (Singapore Branch) (CCECC) and SCB Building Construction Pte Ltd at S$263 million (US$192.79 million) on 6 April 2021. Construction is scheduled to start in the second quarter of 2021, with expected completion in 2029.

== Station details ==
The station will serve the JRL and will be located between the Tukang and Jurong Pier stations. The official station code will be JS11. The station will span over Jurong Pier Road, at the junction with Bird Park Drive just south of the Ayer Rajah Expressway (AYE) interchange. With four entrances, the station will serve Jurong Hill Park to the west and surrounding industrial developments.
