= Boon Lay (planning area) =

Planning Area and HDB Town in West Region, Singapore

- Planning Area and HDB Town

Other transcription(s)
  - Chinese: 文礼 (Simplified) 文禮 (Traditional); Wénlǐ (Pinyin); Bûn-lé (Hokkien POJ)
  - Malay: Boon Lay (Rumi)
  - Tamil: பூன் லே Pūṉ Lē (Transliteration)
- Location of Boon Lay in Singapore
- Country: Singapore
- Region: West Region
- CDC: South West CDC

Government
  - Mayors: South West CDC: Low Yen Ling
  - Members of Parliament: West Coast-Jurong West GRC: Cassandra Lee

Area
  - Total: 8.28 km^{2} (3.20 sq mi)

Population (2026)
  - Total: 30
  - Rank: 45th
  - Density: 3.6/km^{2} (9.4/sq mi)
  - Rank: 44th

Ethnic groups

Boon Lay is a planning area situated in the West Region of Singapore. It shares boundaries with the planning areas of Pioneer to the west, Jurong West to the north, Jurong East to the east and Jurong Strait to the south.

The Boon Lay Planning Area is distinct from the Boon Lay subzone, which lies within the neighbouring planning area of Jurong West. Together with adjacent Pioneer, the Boon Lay Planning Area forms part of the broader Jurong Industrial Estate.

== Geography ==
=== Location ===
The Boon Lay Planning Area is located along the southwestern coast of the Singapore mainland and to the north of Jurong Island.

Included as part of the territory of Boon Lay Planning Area is Pulau Samulun, a minor island off Singapore's southwestern coast and connected to the mainland via Jalan Samulun.

=== Subzones ===
As defined by the Urban Redevelopment Authority, Boon Lay Planning Area is officially divided into 4 subzones:

| Name of estates | Location | Notable structures | Accessibility |
|---|---|---|---|
| Liu Fang | Areas bounded by Ayer Rajah Expressway (AYE), Pioneer Road, Jalan Buroh and Jurong Port Road | Jurong Hill | Buses |
| Samulun | Areas bounded by Jalan Buroh, Tanjong Kling Road, Shipyard Road, Selat Samulun, Selat Pulau Damar and Jurong Pier Road | Pulau Samulun | Buses |
| Shipyard | Areas bounded by Pioneer Road, Tanjong Kling Road, Shipyard Road, Selat Samulun and Benoi Basin. | | Buses |
| Tukang | Areas bounded by Ayer Rajah Expressway (AYE), Pioneer Road North, International Road and Corporation Road | | Buses |
