= Pioneer, Singapore =

Pioneer
- Planning Area

Other transcription(s)
  - Chinese: 先驱
  - Pinyin: Xiānqū
  - Malay: Pioneer
  - Tamil: பயனியர்
- Location of Pioneer in Singapore

- Location within Singapore
- Coordinates: 1°18′55″N 103°40′23″E
- Country: Singapore
- Region: West
- Town Council: West Coast–Jurong West
- Constituencies: West Coast–Jurong West GRC

Government
  - Mayors: South West CDC: Low Yen Ling
  - Members of Parliament: Cassandra Lee

Area
  - Total: 12.2 km^{2} (4.7 sq mi)

Population (2026)
  - Total: 50
  - Density: 4.1/km^{2} (11/sq mi)

Ethnic groups

Pioneer is a planning area located in the West Region of Singapore, named after Pioneer Road. The area is bounded by Jurong West to the north, Boon Lay to the east, Tuas to the west, the Western Water Catchment to the northwest and Selat Jurong to the south. It contains several major industrial estates including Joo Koon, Benoi and Gul Circle, which form part of the larger Jurong Industrial Estate. Pioneer today comprises five subzones: Benoi Sector, Gul Basin, Gul Circle, Joo Koon and the Pioneer Sector itself.

== Etymology ==
The area was formerly known as Jalan Besi. During the development of Jurong Industrial Estate, JTC Corporation renamed the Malay-named roads in the area into English, particularly those near Jalan Buroh. Pioneer Road was previously Jalan Besi (Malay: Metal Road), Pioneer Road North was Jalan Bandaran (Malay: Town Road) and Pioneer Circus was Bulatan Besi (Malay: Metal Circus or Metal Circle).
