= The JTC Summit =

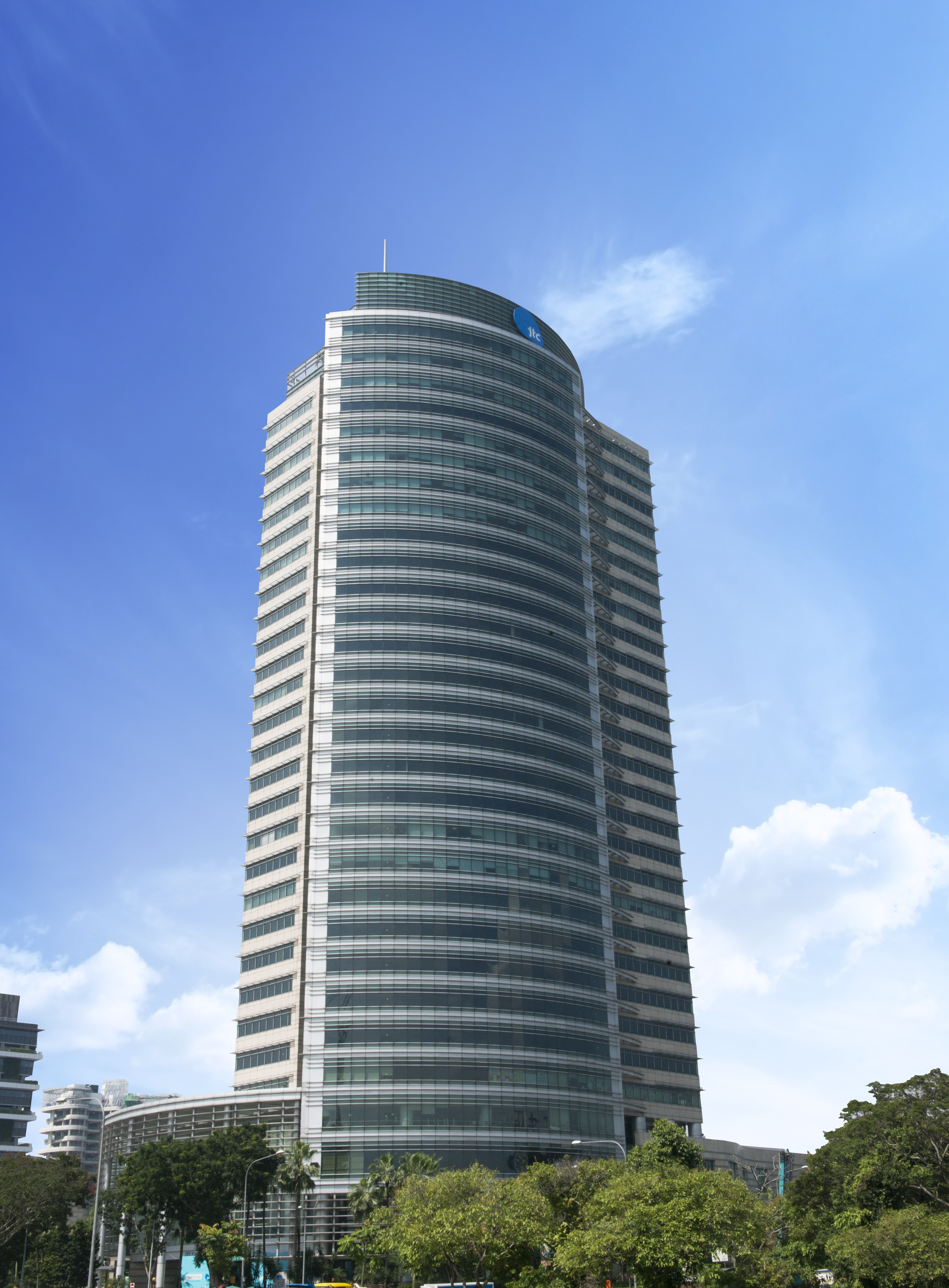
- The JTC Summit
- Interactive map of the The JTC Summit area

General information
- Status: Completed
- Location: 8 Jurong Town Hall Road, Singapore 609434
- Coordinates: 1.3313°N 103.7417°E
- Opening: 2000
- Owner: JTC Corporation

Height
- Height: 142 m (466 ft)

Technical details
- Floor count: 32
- Floor area: 56,737 m^{2} (610,710 sq ft)

Design and construction
- Architect: AWP Architects
- Developer: JTC Corporation

The JTC Summit is a skyscraper located in Jurong East, Singapore. Completed in 2000, it serves as the corporate headquarters of JTC Corporation. At completion, it was the tallest building in Singapore located outside the Central Region at 142 m (466 ft), and remains so as of 2026.

== History ==
The construction of The JTC Summit was part of a broader plan to decentralise commercial activity from the Central Area to regional centres. Prior to its completion, JTC Corporation was headquartered at the nearby Jurong Town Hall. In 2000, JTC moved its operations to the new tower to accommodate its growing workforce and to anchor the development of the Jurong Lake District. The building's opening was officiated by Lee Hsien Loong on 15 November that year, who was then a deputy prime minister.

In 2012, the building was awarded the BCA Green Mark Platinum certification by the Building and Construction Authority (BCA) for its sustainable features, including energy-efficient lighting and water conservation systems.

== Design and architecture ==
The building was designed by AWP Architects. It features a curved facade that offers panoramic views of the Jurong Lake and the surrounding industrial estates. The tower consists of a 31 to 32-storey office block sitting atop a 4-storey public podium.

The structure was built with a column-free interior layout to maximize floor space efficiency for its tenants. The exterior utilises a combination of glass curtain walls and reinforced concrete, typical of high-rise commercial architecture in the late 1990s.

== See also ==
- List of tallest buildings in Singapore
- Jurong Lake District
- JTC Corporation
