= Pioneer Secondary School =

Former school in Singapore

- Sekolah Menengah Pioneer 先驱中校

Location
- 21 Jurong West Street 81; Singapore 649075; Singapore
- Coordinates: 1.3479°N 103.6947°E

Information
- Type: Government
- Motto: Persevere Seek Serve
- Established: 1994; 32 years ago
- Closed: 2016; 10 years ago
- Session: Single
- School code: 3062
- Gender: Mixed
- Colours: Red, White

Pioneer Secondary School (abbreviation: PSS) was a government co-educational secondary school in Jurong West, Singapore.

It existed from 1994 to 2016.

Due to falling enrolment, the school was merged into Boon Lay Secondary School.

== History ==
The school officially opened in December 1994. While awaiting the completion of its building, it was temporarily located at Hong Kah Secondary School In March 2016, it was announced that due to falling student cohort sizes the school would be merged with Boon Lay Secondary School. The merge is expected to be done in January 2017 with the new school located at Boon Lay Secondary School.

=== Principals ===
| Principal | Year(s) |
|---|---|
| Mrs Yeo Chin Nam | 1994 |
| Mrs Tan Sor Poh | 1994-1999 |
| Mr Tan Chor Pang | 1994-2005 |
| Mr Satianathan s/o K. Nadarajah | 2005-2011 |
| Mr Chan Weng Kit Mark | 2012-2016 |
| Refer to Boon Lay Secondary School | 2016- |

=== Notable alumni ===
- Ronny Chieng: comedian, actor and radio presenter based in New York City
- Desmond Tan: actor, Mediacorp
