= Boon Lay Secondary School =

- 文礼中学; Sekolah Menengah Boon Lay

Location
- 11 Jurong West Street 65; Singapore 648354; Singapore; 1.34335°N 103.69969°E

Information
- Type: Government
- Motto: To Love and To Forgive
- Established: 1977; 49 years ago
- Session: Single
- Principal: Chan Zheng Ming
- Gender: Mixed
- Colour: Blue Silver
- Website: www.boonlaysec.moe.edu.sg/

Boon Lay Secondary School (BLS) is a government secondary school located in Jurong West, Singapore.

== History ==
The school commenced operations in 1977 at a S$3.59 million campus at the junction of Boon Lay Way and Jalan Boon Lay, with 13 classes, seven of which were English-medium and the remaining six Chinese-medium. It was officially opened in 1979 by the then-Member of parliament for Boon Lay Ngeow Pack Hua. It became a solely English-medium school in 1998, and started operating single-session in 2000.

In 1996, Boon Lay began enrolling deaf students. Specifically it educated deaf students who were required to use sign language to communicate. In 2017 the Government of Singapore designated Beatty Secondary School as the school to educate deaf students who must use sign language, concentrating all such students at one school due to them numbering about 15.

=== Principals ===
Pre-Merger
Post-Merger
Both

Principal	Years
Mr Ng Siok Yen	1977-1981
Mr Tan Kiok Ngiap	1981-1982
Mr Kiat Jun Ngin	1982-1988
Mr Toh Chye Seng	1988-1992
Mrs Yu Sing Tong	1992-1995
Ms Ong Pheng Ye	1995-1997
Ms Lui Yin Leng	1997-2000
Ms Peck Soo Hiong	2000-2001
Ms Doris Ho	2001-2008
Mr Victor Giam Chong Guan	2008-2014
Mr Tan Chor Pang	2014-2019
Mr Inderjit Singh	2020-2025
Mr Chan Zheng Ming	2025-present

=== Merger with Pioneer Secondary ===
In 2017, Boon Lay Secondary School absorbed Pioneer Secondary School due to falling enrolment in both schools.

== School identity and culture ==
=== Crest ===
The current school crest was introduced in November 2016, in order to commemorate the merger of the school with Pioneer Secondary from then on. It depicts two people moving as one moving towards their goals, embodying a teacher and student working together. Its resemblance to a ladder also calls for its students to spur on to greater heights. The crest is accompanied by the acronym of the school and its Chinese name, the latter indicating the school's early years as a Chinese-medium school.

=== CCA Centric School ===
As part of the phasing-out of streaming, Boon Lay has been dividing classes by their students' co-curricular activities (CCA) since 2017. The CCAs are also divided into houses, these are Garnet, Emerald, Morganite and Sapphire.

=== List of CCAs ===
Garnet	Chinese Orchestra	Basketball	National Civil Defence Cadet Corps	CyberAce
Emerald	National Cadet Corps	Netball	Contemporary Dance	Boys' Brigade
Morganite	St John Brigade	Audio Visual Aid	Choir	Concert Band
Sapphire	National Police Cadet Corps	Malay Dance	Musical Theatre	Badminton

== Notable alumni ==
- Ken Chu: Member, Taiwanese boy band, F4
