= JTC Corporation =

Singaporean agency for sustainable development

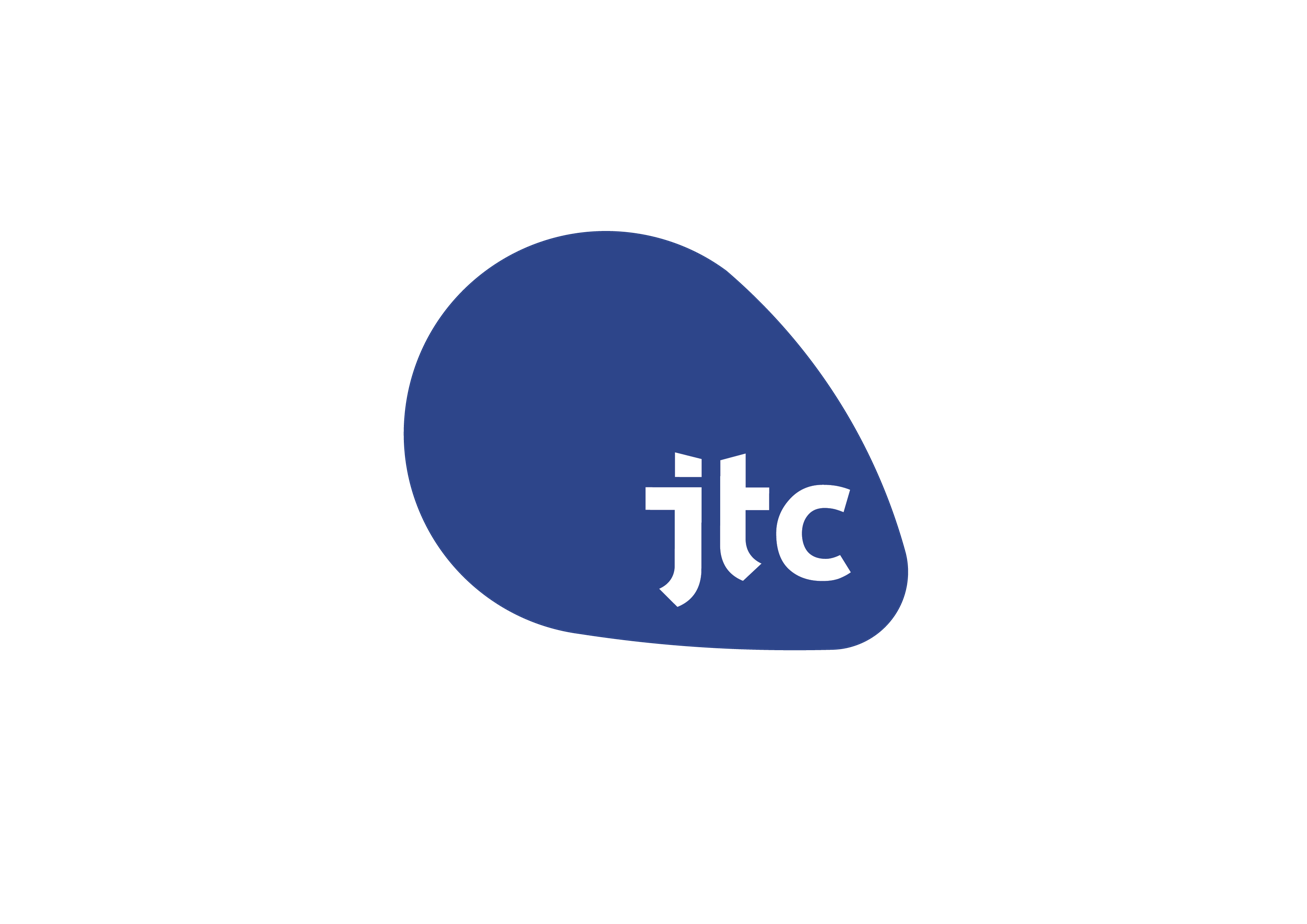

Agency overview
- Formed: 1 June 1968; 58 years ago
- Preceding agency: Jurong Town Corporation
- Headquarters: The JTC Summit, 8 Jurong Town Hall Road, Singapore 609434
- Agency executives: Chia Song Hwee, Chairman; Jacqueline Poh, CEO
- Parent agency: Ministry of Energy, Trade and Industry
- Website: www.jtc.gov.sg
- Agency ID: T08GB0025A

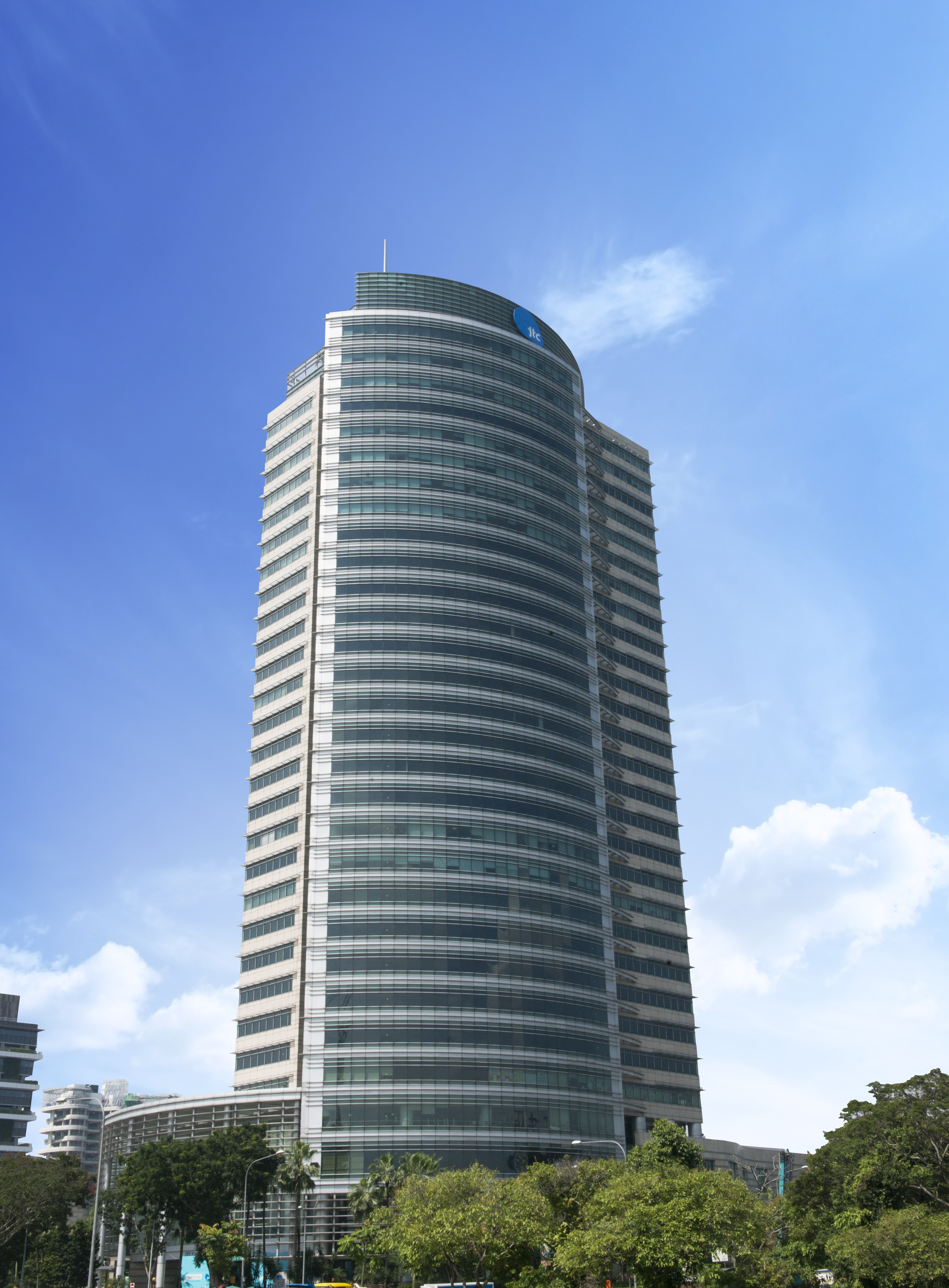
The JTC Summit

JTC Corporation (JTC), formerly the Jurong Town Corporation, is a statutory board under Singapore's Ministry of Energy, Trade and Industry that champions sustainable industrial development. It master-plans clean, green and smart estates to create attractive destinations for Singapore's talent and communities. The agency also drives innovations in the building and infrastructure sector.

== History ==
Established on 1 June 1968 as the Jurong Town Corporation, JTC oversaw the development of Singapore's first industrial estate, and the launch of Singapore's industrialisation drive. The bulk of the agency's mission was focused on the development of the Jurong Industrial Estate. To do this, JTC developed Jurong holistically, to encourage Singaporeans to move in, work and raise their families there. A large Town Centre was built, complete with shops and facilities, and a drive-in cinema. The first childcare centre and first hawker centre were both set up in Jurong. As part of Singapore's Garden City campaign, JTC also planned Jurong Park, that comprised the Chinese and Japanese Gardens, which are set to be the centrepiece of the Jurong Lake District today.

As Singapore's industrialisation took off, JTC's portfolio expanded beyond Jurong Town, where it built and managed industrial estates and flatted factories all over Singapore, such as Toa Payoh, Sembawang, Changi and Kranji. As Singapore's economy developed over the years, JTC provided new infrastructure to support Singapore's industries. When Singapore transitioned to a more knowledge-based and technology-intensive economy, JTC developed the Science Park, one-north and CleanTech Park to support hi-tech R&D sectors. Other notable projects by the agency include International Business Park, Changi Business Park, Jurong Island, Seletar Aerospace Park, and Singapore's four wafer fabrication parks.

== Projects ==
In 2016, it was announced that JTC is planning and developing a new Jurong Innovation District (JID), envisioned as the industrial park of the future. The 600-hectare district is set to become a one-stop advanced manufacturing campus housing an ecosystem of Research and Development (R&D) institutes, technology, and training providers, as well as advanced manufacturing itself. In 2018, JTC unveiled the plan for the 50-hectare mixed-use Punggol Digital District (PDD) that will support the growth of the digital economy. Opening in phases from 2023, PDD expects to create up to 28,000 digital economy jobs.

In February 2020, JTC announced that it will be revamping the 500-hectare Sungei Kadut industrial estate, one of the oldest industrial estates in Singapore, to support the transformation of traditional manufacturing industries as well as new growth sectors in agri-tech and environmental technologies. The estate will be developed progressively over the next 20 to 30 years, creating space for businesses in the timber, furniture, construction, and waste management industries. A key feature of the revamp is the development of an 18-hectare Agri-Food Innovation Park, that will unite R&D, prototyping and high-tech operations such as vertical farming and aquaculture hatcheries.

JTC was appointed by the Singapore Government to be a Centre of Excellence for Building & Infrastructure and Underground Caverns, where it uses its specialist knowledge to support other government organizations in their projects.

Aside from developing the physical space, JTC works towards strengthening collaborations within business communities in its estates to create new business opportunities. It also emphasizes on striking a balance between the economic and environmental aspect in its developmental approach, where it has been progressively adopting renewable energy sources, and smart systems that optimize resource utilization. JTC had also announced a number of initiatives inviting its industry partners to contribute towards making estates greener.

== Industrial and Business Parks ==
Specialized Industrial Park

- Airport Logistics Park of Singapore
- Jurong Island
- LogisParks
- MedTech Park
- Offshore Marine Centre
- Seletar Aerospace Park
- Tuas Biomedical Park
- Wafer Fab & Advanced Display Parks

Business Park

- Changi Business Park
- CleanTech Park
- International Business Park
- Jurong Innovation District
- Mediapolis
- One-north
- Punggol Digital District
- Woodlands North Coast
- Sungei Kadut Eco-District

== See also ==
- Biopolis
- Fusionopolis
