= Gul Circle =

- Subzone of Pioneer Planning Area

Name transcription(s)
  - Chinese: 卡尔圈
  - Pinyin: Kǎ'ěrquān
  - Tamil: கல் சர்க்கல்
- Interactive map of Gul Circle
- Coordinates: 1°19′22.0″N 103°39′48.6″E
- Country: Singapore

Gul Circle (or Gul) is an area in Jurong Industrial Estate which is the biggest industrial estate in Singapore. Gul is the home to many heavy industries in Singapore. It is bounded by Ayer Rajah Expressway (Jalan Ahmad Ibrahim), Benoi Road, Pioneer Road and Tuas Road. Tuas Fire Station is located at Gul as well.

The area is known as Tanjong Gul in the old maps of Singapore.

== Transportation ==
=== Rail ===
Gul Circle is served by Gul Circle MRT station on the East–West Line and future Cross Island Line. A planned station on the Cross Island Line, CR22 station, is expected to open in the late 2030s.

=== Buses ===
Public bus services link the estate to Joo Koon Bus Interchange and MRT station. A bus interchange connected to Gul Circle MRT station is also planned.
