= Cyber Command (Singapore) =

Line unit in Singapore Police Force

- Abbreviation: CyberCom

Agency overview
- Formed: 3 July 2026
- Preceding agency: Criminal Investigation Department

Jurisdictional structure
- National agency: Singapore
- Operations jurisdiction: Singapore
- Governing body: Government of Singapore
- General nature: Civilian police

Operational structure
- Headquarters: Police Cantonment Complex
- Elected officers responsible: K. Shanmugam, Coordinating Minister for National Security & Minister for Home Affairs; Edwin Tong, 2nd Minister for Home Affairs; Muhammad Faishal Ibrahim, Senior Minister of State for Home Affairs; Sim Ann, Senior Minister of State for Home Affairs; Goh Pei Ming, Minister of State for Home Affairs
- Agency executives: SAC Justin Wong, Commander CyberCom; DAC Gregory Kang, Deputy Commander; AC Aileen Yap, Deputy Commander (Cyber Operations)
- Parent agency: Ministry of Home Affairs

The Cyber Command (CyberCom) is a line unit of the Singapore Police Force (SPF). It was established in July 2026 as part of its strategy to combat cybercrime. It primarily targets online scams and other cybercrime activities.

It is led by the Commander of Cyber Command and assisted by a Deputy Commander.

== Overview ==
First announced in May 2026, the CyberCom was formed on 3 July 2026 in an effort by the SPF to unify its cyber capabilities targeting scams and cybercrimes. It absorbed officers from the Criminal Investigation Department and Commercial Affairs Department, including the Anti-Scam Centre.

== Structure ==
CyberCom is led by a Commander, who is supported by a Deputy Commander.

There are seven divisions within the CyberCom:

1. Cyber Operations Centre
2. Investigations Division
3. Intelligence Division
4. Scams Public Education Officer
5. Partnerships & Engagement Division
6. Technology & Development Division
7. Planning & Corporate Services Division

== See also ==
- Crime in Singapore
