= Bukit Merah =

- Planning Area and HDB Town

Other transcription(s)
  - English: Bukit Merah / Redhill
  - Chinese: 红山 / 紅山 (Note: informally written as 武吉美拉; Wǔjí Měilā. The Chinese name 武吉美拉 does not align with Singapore's language policy, which favors semantic translation (conveying meaning rather than sound). It would be unfamiliar or confusing to native Chinese speakers who expect meaningful place names.); Hóngshān (Pinyin); Âng-soaⁿ (Hokkien POJ); Hung^{4} Saan^{1} (Cantonese Jyutping)
  - Malay: Bukit Merah (Rumi) بوكيت ميره (Jawi)
  - Tamil: புக்கிட் மேரா Pukkiṭ Mērā (Transliteration)
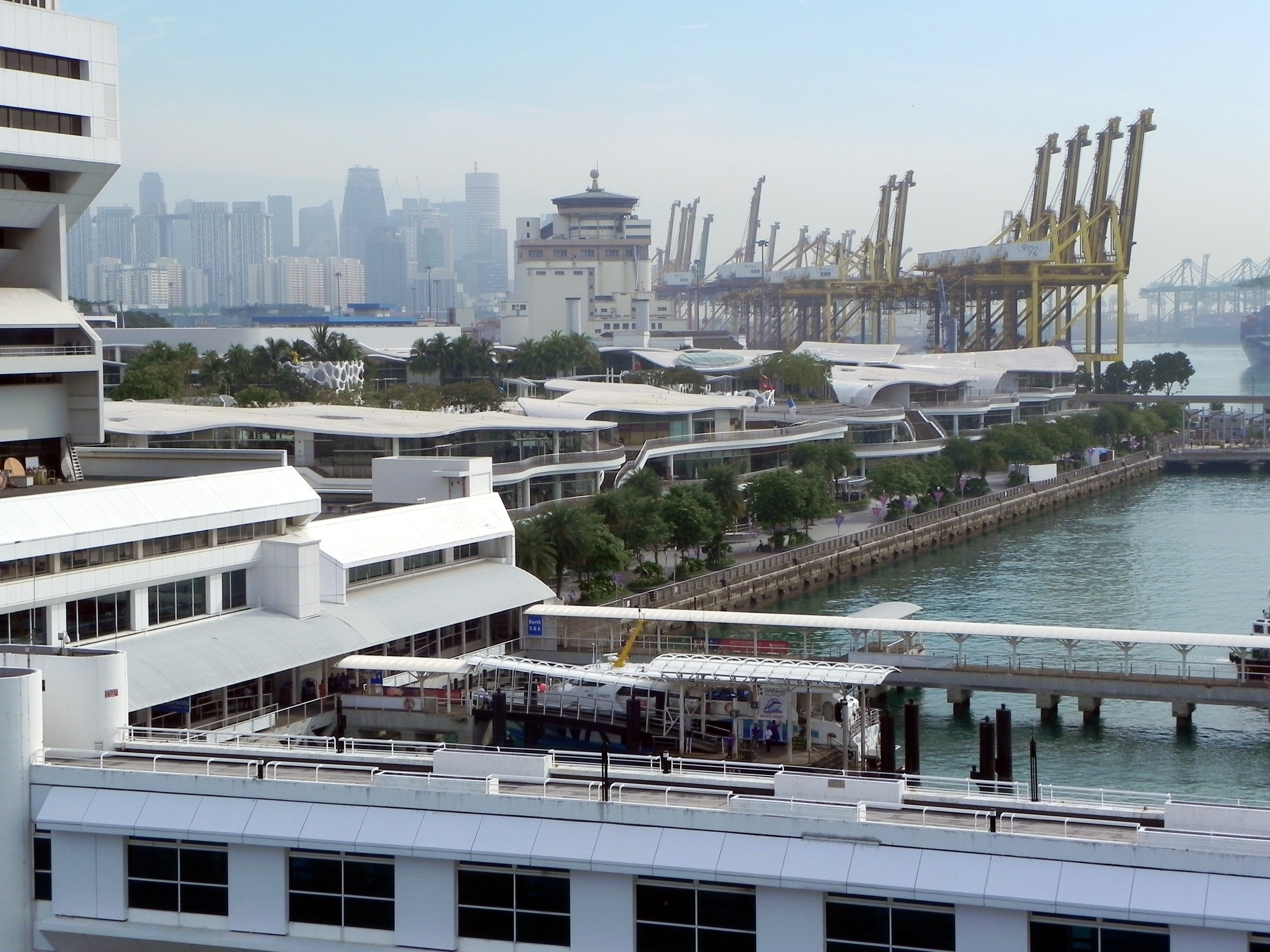
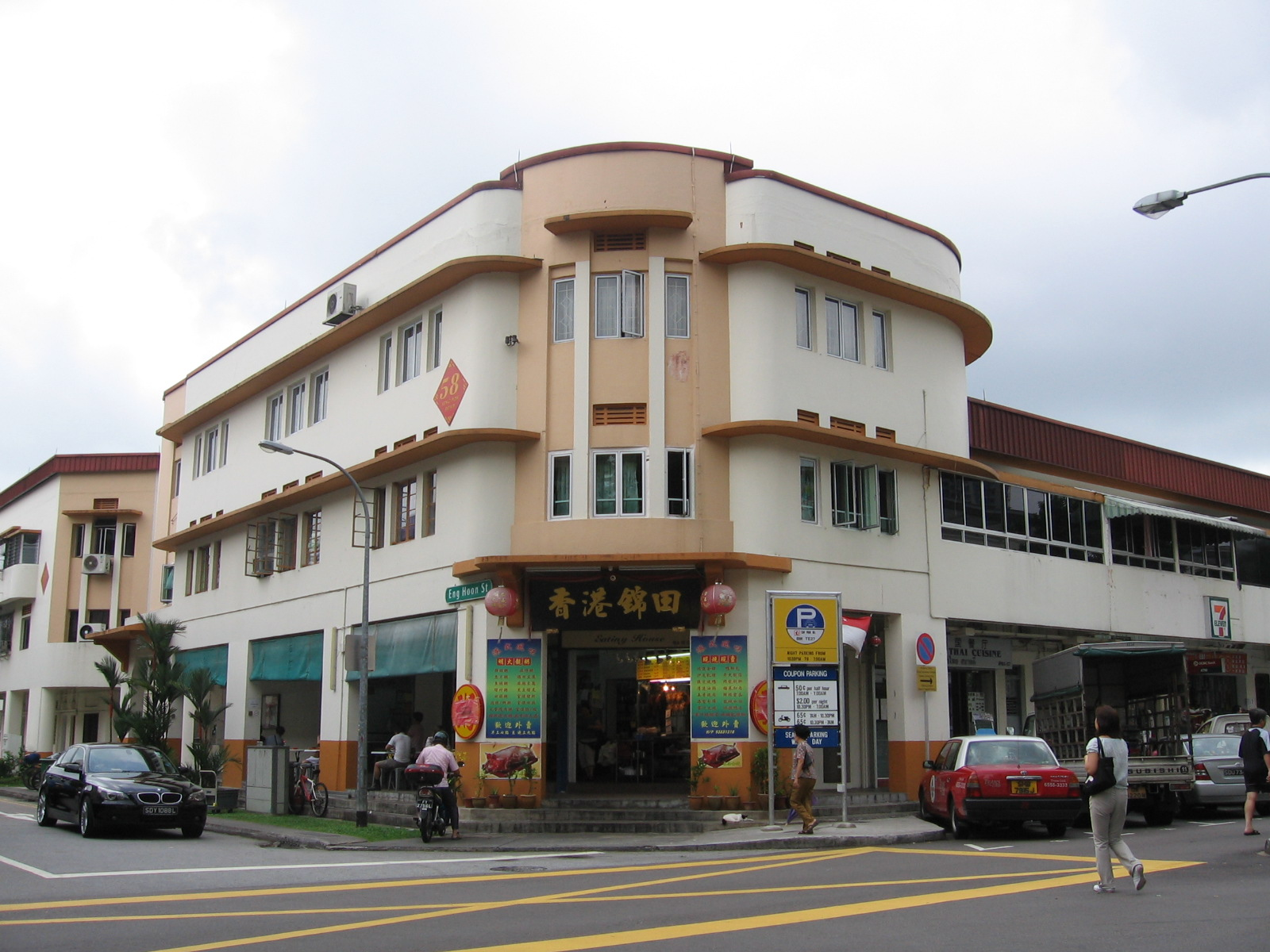
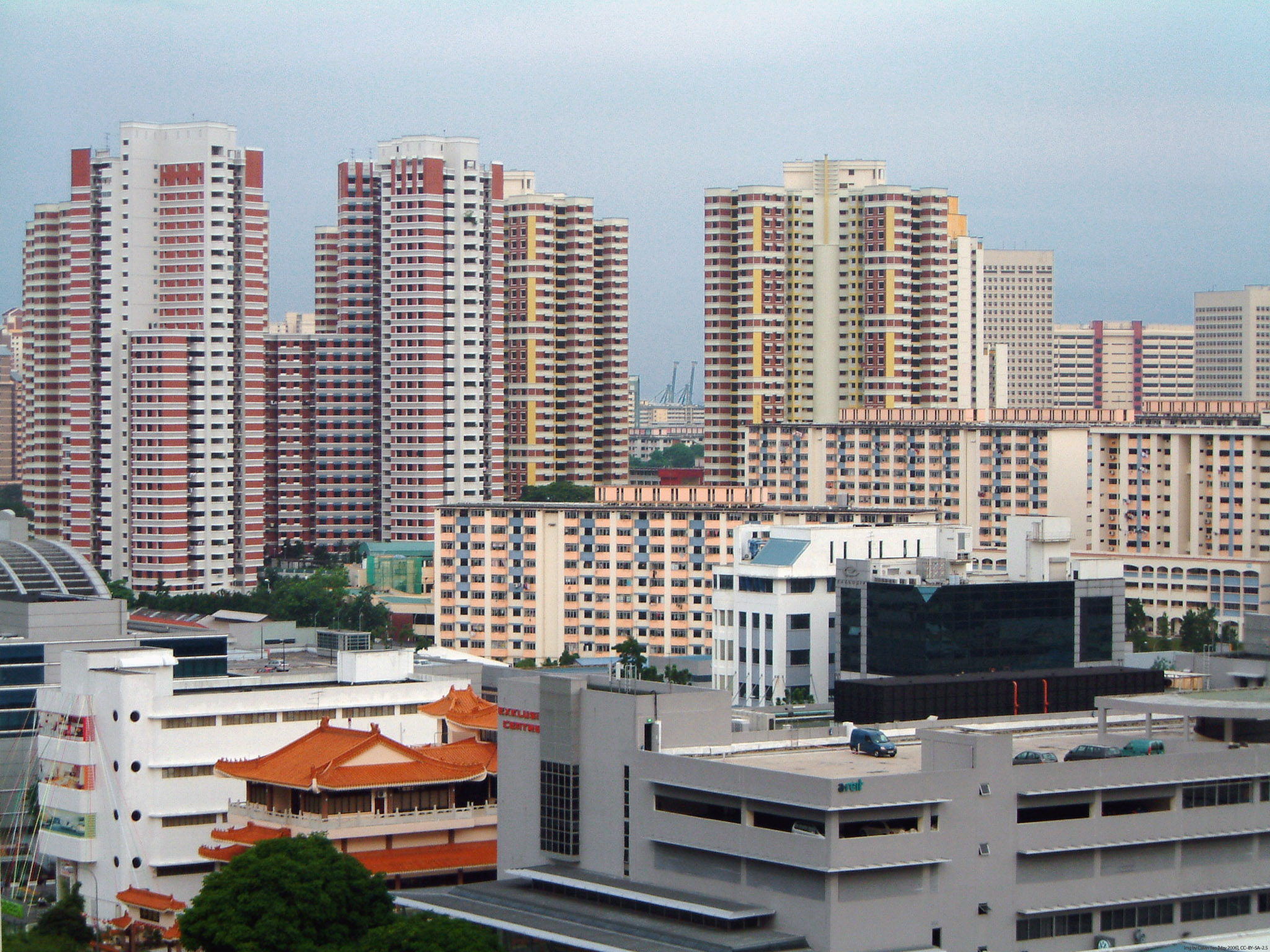
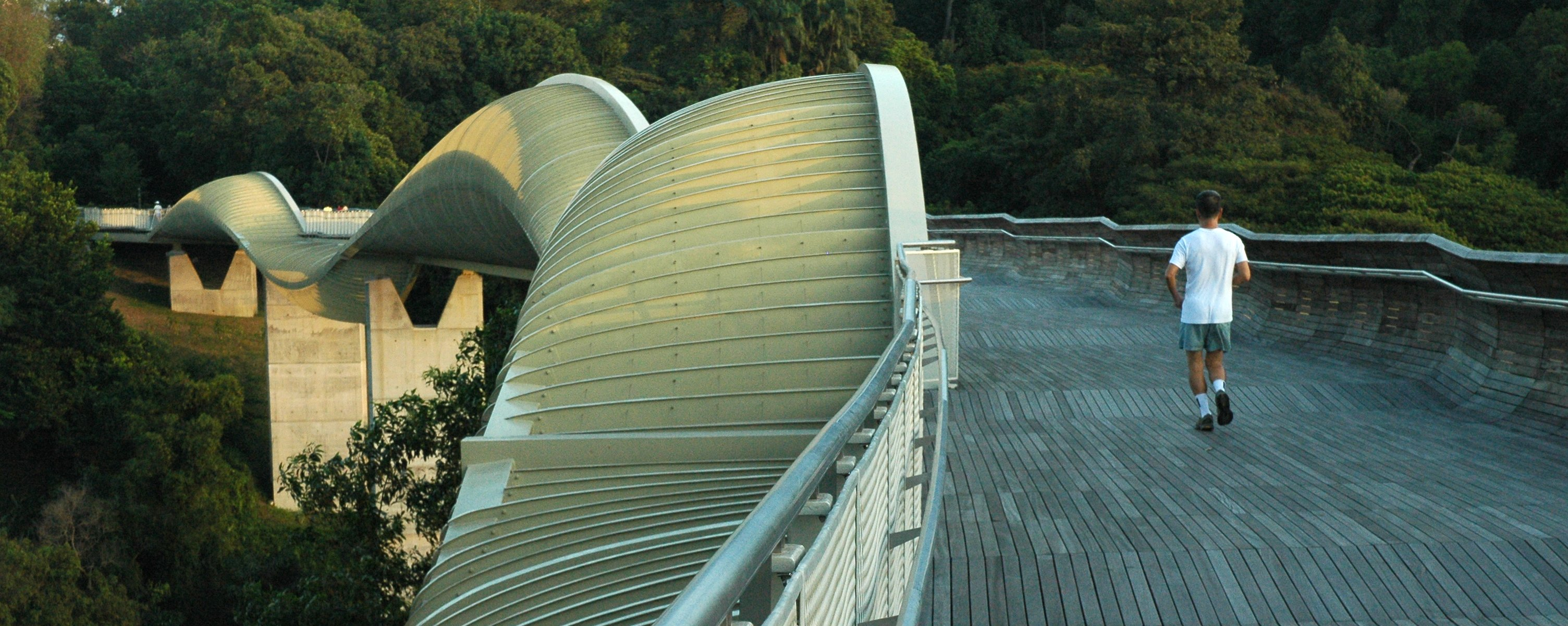
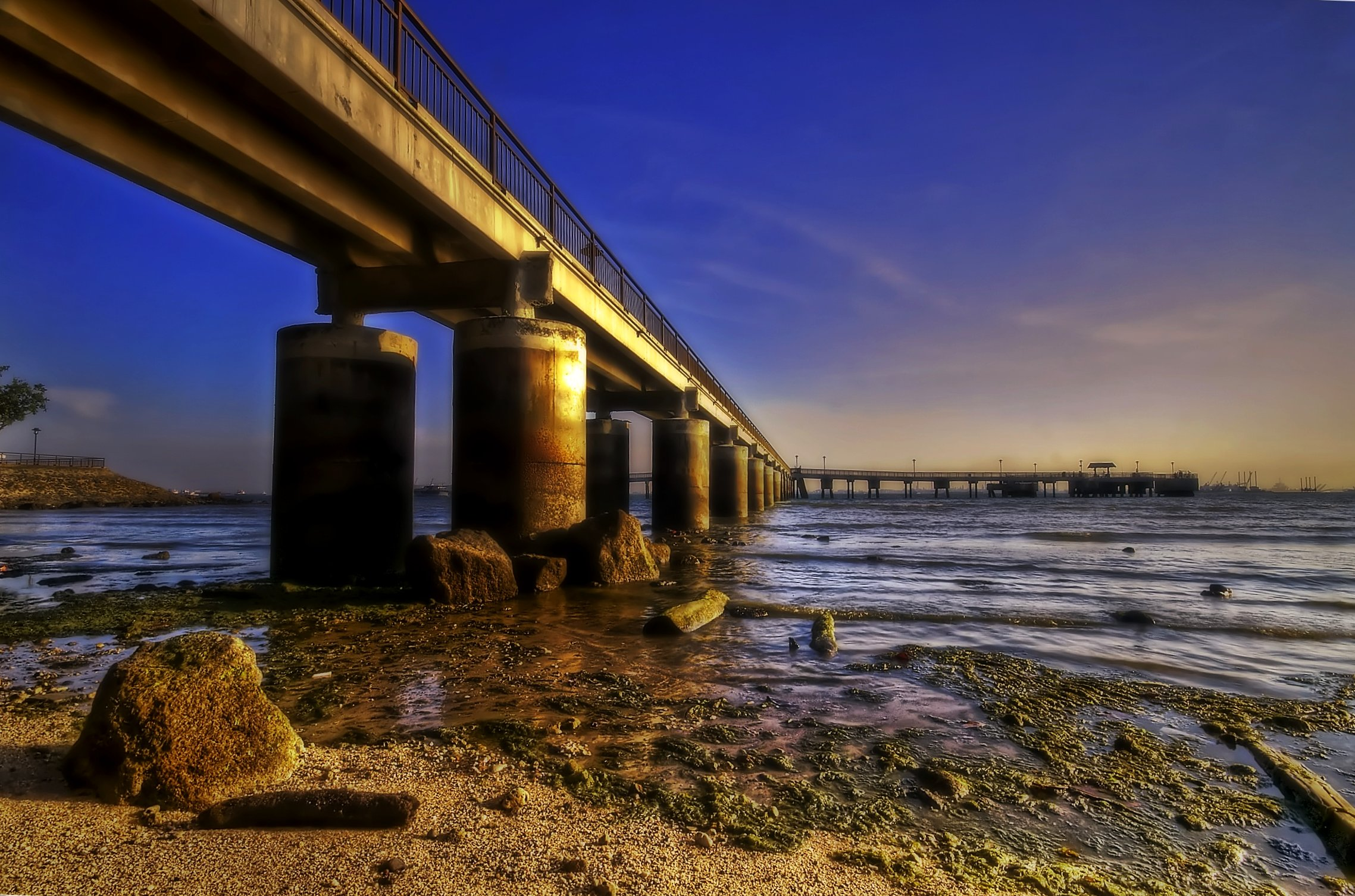
- From top left to right: HarbourFront, Singapore Improvement Trust flats in Tiong Bahru, Skyline of Redhill, Henderson Waves, Jetty at Labrador Nature Reserve

- Location in the Central Region

- Location of Bukit Merah within Singapore
- Coordinates: 1°16′54.86″N 103°49′26.11″E
- Country: Singapore
- Region: Central Region
- CDCs: Central Singapore CDC
- Town councils: Jalan Besar Town Council; Tanjong Pagar Town Council
- Constituencies: Jalan Besar GRC; Radin Mas SMC; Queenstown SMC; Tanjong Pagar GRC

Government
  - Mayors: Central Singapore CDC: Denise Phua
  - Members of Parliament: Jalan Besar GRC: Josephine Teo; Radin Mas SMC: Melvin Yong; Queenstown SMC: Eric Chua; Tanjong Pagar GRC: Rachel Ong; Foo Cexiang; Joan Pereira

Area
  - Total: 14.46 km^{2} (5.58 sq mi)
  - Residential: 3.12 km^{2} (1.20 sq mi)

Population (2026)
  - Total: 148,270
  - Density: 10,250/km^{2} (26,560/sq mi)

Ethnic groups
  - Chinese: 120,830
  - Malays: 11,430
  - Indians: 13,980
  - Others: 5,010
- Postal districts: 2, 3, 4, 5, 9, 10
- Dwelling units: 51,885
- Projected ultimate: 68,000

Bukit Merah, (Note: IPA: /ˈbʊkɪt ˌmeɪrɑː, -ˌmɛrɑː/ BUUK-it MAY-rah or BUUK-it MERR-ah) also known as Redhill, is a planning area and new town situated in the southernmost part of the Central Region of Singapore. The planning area borders Tanglin to the north, Queenstown to the west, and the Downtown Core, Outram and Singapore River planning areas of the Central Area to the east. It also shares a maritime boundary with the Southern Islands planning area to the south. Bukit Merah is linked to Sentosa Island via Sentosa Gateway, Sentosa Broadwalk, Sentosa Express, and the Cable Car.

Bukit Merah planning area also includes two offshore islands which are linked to the mainland by road, namely Pulau Brani and Keppel Island. It is the most populous planning area in the Central Region and the 12th most populous in the country, with more than 150,000 residents.

== Etymology ==
Bukit Merah translates to "red hill" in Malay, and is a reference to the red-coloured lateritic soil found on the hill. According to the Sejarah Melayu, Singapore was once plagued by swordfish attacking people living along the coast. A young boy named Hang Nadim proposed an ingenious solution to build a wall of banana stems along the coast at the present location of Tanjong Pagar.

When the swordfish attacked, their snouts were stuck in the stems. With the swordfish problem solved, Hang Nadim earned great respect from the people, but also jealousy from the rulers. The fourth King of Singapura, Paduka Seri Maharaja, finally ordered his execution, and it was said that his blood soaked the soil of the hill where he was killed, giving rise to the red-coloured hill.

The hill was eventually trimmed to its current state in 1973, when it made way for Redhill Close and what would become the now-defunct Henderson Secondary School. During its existence, a Chinese cemetery was situated on the reverse side of this hill, which is today the location of Tiong Bahru.

== History ==
Keppel Harbour dates back to the 14th century when an ancient Chinese traveller, Wang Dayuan named the harbour"Long-Ya-Men" or "Dragon Teeth Gate" after two rock outcrops located near Labrador Park, which resembled dragon's teeth. The two rock outcrops were subsequently blown up by the Straits Settlements Surveyor, John Thomson, in August 1848 to widen the entrance to a new harbour.

With the earliest records of Bukit Merah's existence in the Malay Annals, the town had a considerable role to play in the early maritime trade of the Kingdom of Singapura.

Mount Faber was once known as Telok Blangah Hill. Its name was changed to Mount Faber after Captain Edward Faber cut a road to the top in 1845 to establish a signal station. The Singapore General Hospital site dates back to 1882. Labrador Nature Park was used as a defence outpost in the 19th century until World War II.

The town's fertile red soil was put to great effect during British colonial rule, when it was a district rich in gambier cultivation.

Even before the industrialisation of Jurong, Bukit Merah already had a small head start in the emerging heavy industry market in Singapore. With the first brickwork factories and mills emerging in the precincts of Henderson Hill and Redhill as early as the 1930s.

The town is also home to the first housing estate in the country, Tiong Bahru, which was developed by the Singapore Improvement Trust in the backdrop of a rapidly growing population in post-war Singapore. The estate later became the basis for the Republic's first new town, Queenstown.

== Geography ==
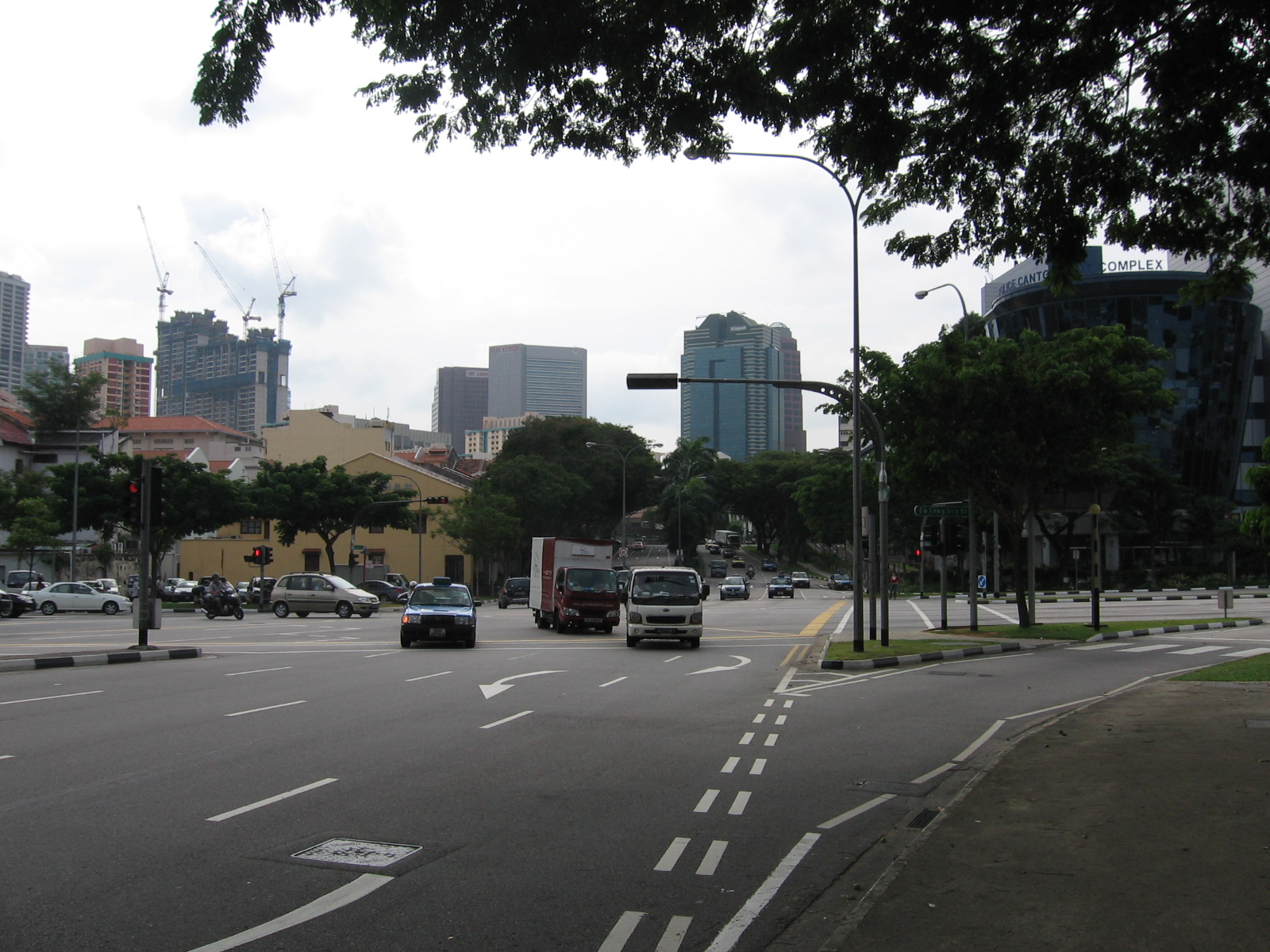
The Bukit Merah–Central Area boundary line along Outram Road as seen from Bukit Merah.

According to the various master plans laid out by the Urban Redevelopment Authority, Bukit Merah is bounded by Alexandra Canal and the Singapore River to the north and HarbourFront and Keppel Bay to the south, Kim Seng Road, Outram Road and Cantonment Road to the east and Alexandra Road to the west. There are 17 subzones within the planning area, including Alexandra, Bukit Ho Swee, Bukit Merah, City Terminals, Depot Road, Everton Park, HarbourFront, Henderson Hill, Redhill, Singapore General Hospital, Telok Blangah and Tiong Bahru.

=== Subzones ===
Name of subzones	Location	Notable structures	Accessibility
Alexandra	Areas along Alexandra Road, Jalan Bukit Merah, Jalan Rumah Tinggi, and Hoy Fatt Road	Alexandra Primary School, Alexandra Central, Alexandra Village, AIA Building, and IKEA Alexandra	Labrador Park MRT station, Redhill MRT station and buses
Bukit Ho Swee	Areas along Jalan Bukit Ho Swee and Delta	Beo Crescent Market, Havelock Food Centre, Kim Seng Community Centre, and Singapore Examinations and Assessment Board	Tiong Bahru MRT station, Havelock MRT station and buses
Bukit Merah	Areas along Bukit Merah Central	Bukit Merah Town Centre, Bukit Merah Bus Interchange, Bukit Merah Polyclinic, Former HDB Centre, Bukit Merah Secondary School, Gan Eng Seng Primary School, and Wat Ananda Metyarama Thai Buddhist Temple	Buses
City Terminals	Pulau Brani and areas near Keppel Harbour	Port of Singapore Keppel Terminal, Police Coast Guard Headquarters and St. James Power Station	Keppel MRT station and buses. Keppel Terminal is a restricted area.
Depot Road	Areas along Depot Road	Central Manpower Base, Defence Science and Technology Agency, Depot Heights Shopping Centre, ISS International School, North London Collegiate School (Singapore) and The Interlace	Buses
Everton Park	Areas bounded by Cantonment Road, Neil Road, Keppel Road	Cantonment Primary School, Former Tanjong Pagar railway station, Kampong Bahru Bus Terminal and Police Cantonment Complex	Cantonment MRT station, buses
HarbourFront	Bukit Merah South	HarbourFront Bus Interchange, HarbourFront Centre, Singapore Cruise Centre, VivoCity	HarbourFront MRT station, buses, cable car, Sentosa Express
Henderson Hill	Bukit Merah West	Bukit Merah West NPC, Delta Sports Complex, Gan Eng Seng School, Henderson Community Club, and Tiong Bahru Park	Buses
Redhill	Northwestern Bukit Merah	Redhill Market and Food Centre, Leng Kee Community Centre, and Enabling Village	Redhill MRT station, buses
Singapore General Hospital	Bukit Merah East	Duke-NUS Graduate Medical School, Health Promotion Board, Health Sciences Authority, Outram Community Hospital & SingHealth Tower, Outram Polyclinic and Singapore General Hospital	Outram Park MRT station, buses
Telok Blangah	Bukit Merah South	Blangah Rise Primary School, CHIJ St. Theresa's Convent, Mount Faber Park, Radin Mas Community Club, Radin Mas Primary School, Tang Gah Beo Temple, SAFRA Mount Faber, Telok Blangah Community Club, and Telok Blangah Hill Park	Telok Blangah MRT station, buses
Tiong Bahru	Area bounded by Jalan Bukit Ho Swee, Outram Road, CTE, AYE, and Lower Delta Road	Tiong Bahru Community Centre, Tiong Bahru Market, Tiong Bahru Plaza and Zhangde Primary School	Tiong Bahru MRT station, buses

== Transportation ==
=== Mass Rapid Transit ===
There are currently 9 MRT stations that serve the planning area across four lines, the East West Line, Circle Line, North East Line and the Thomson-East Coast Line.

Outram Park MRT station became a double-line interchange station with the opening of the NEL station in 2003 and subsequently became a triple-line interchange station after the commencement of the third stage of the Thomson–East Coast Line in November 2022.

HarbourFront MRT station opened in 2003 and is the southern terminus of the North East Line, replacing Tiong Bahru as the closest MRT station to the HarbourFront district and Sentosa The Circle Line segment of HarbourFront station opened in October 2011, which also served as the line's terminus until the opening of line's sixth stage in 2026. Stage 6 of the Circle line had officially begun operations in July 2026, which completed the line's loop with the opening of three stations, including two in Bukit Merah, Keppel and Cantonment.

The 9 stations that are currently operational are:

- TE16 Havelock
- EW16 NE3 TE17 Outram Park
- EW17 Tiong Bahru
- EW18 Redhill
- CC27 Labrador Park
- CC28 Telok Blangah
- NE1 CC29 HarbourFront
- CC30 Keppel
- CC31 Cantonment

During the 2025 Committee of Supply debate, Minister for Transport Chee Hong Tat announced that feasibility studies are underway for a proposed MRT line, tentatively named the Tengah line. If found feasible, the line, which will serve areas including Bukit Merah, could be built from the 2040s.

=== Bus ===
There are two bus interchanges and one bus terminal in the new town. The Bukit Merah Bus Interchange, which serves Bukit Merah, is located at Bukit Merah Town Centre. Service Number 132 links the Interchange to Redhill MRT station while bus services 5, 16, and 851 link the interchange to Tiong Bahru MRT station. Two feeder services originate from the interchange serving the Telok Blangah estate. The HarbourFront Bus Interchange is located in the southern part of Bukit Merah, serving nearby amenities such as the HarbourFront Centre and VivoCity, Singapore's largest shopping mall. The Kampong Bahru Bus Terminal is located along Spooner Road, near the vicinity of the Singapore General Hospital.

== Education ==
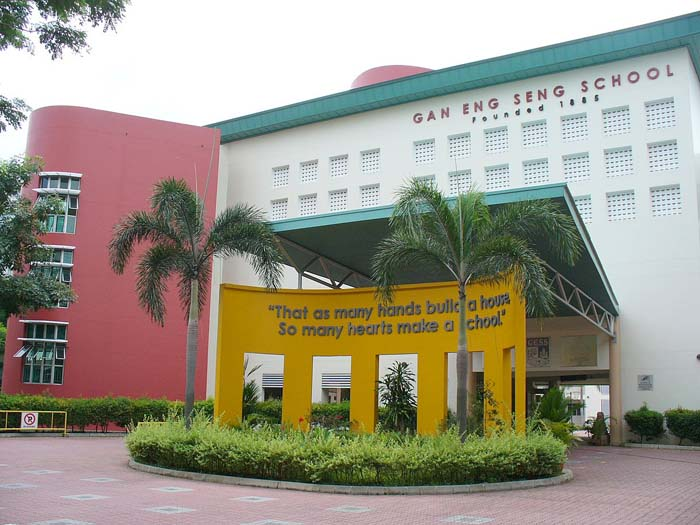
Gan Eng Seng School is one of the oldest schools in Singapore. It is located along Henderson Road.

=== Primary schools ===
- Alexandra Primary School
- Blangah Rise Primary School
- Cantonment Primary School
- CHIJ Kellock
- Gan Eng Seng Primary School
- Radin Mas Primary School
- Zhangde Primary School

=== Secondary schools ===
- Bukit Merah Secondary School
- CHIJ St. Theresa's Convent
- Crescent Girls' School
- Gan Eng Seng School

=== Tertiary institutions ===
- Duke-NUS Graduate Medical School

=== Other schools ===
- Academy of Singapore Teachers (AST)
- APSN Tanglin School
- ISS International School (Preston Campus)
- North London Collegiate School (Singapore)
- Shelton College International

== Amenities ==
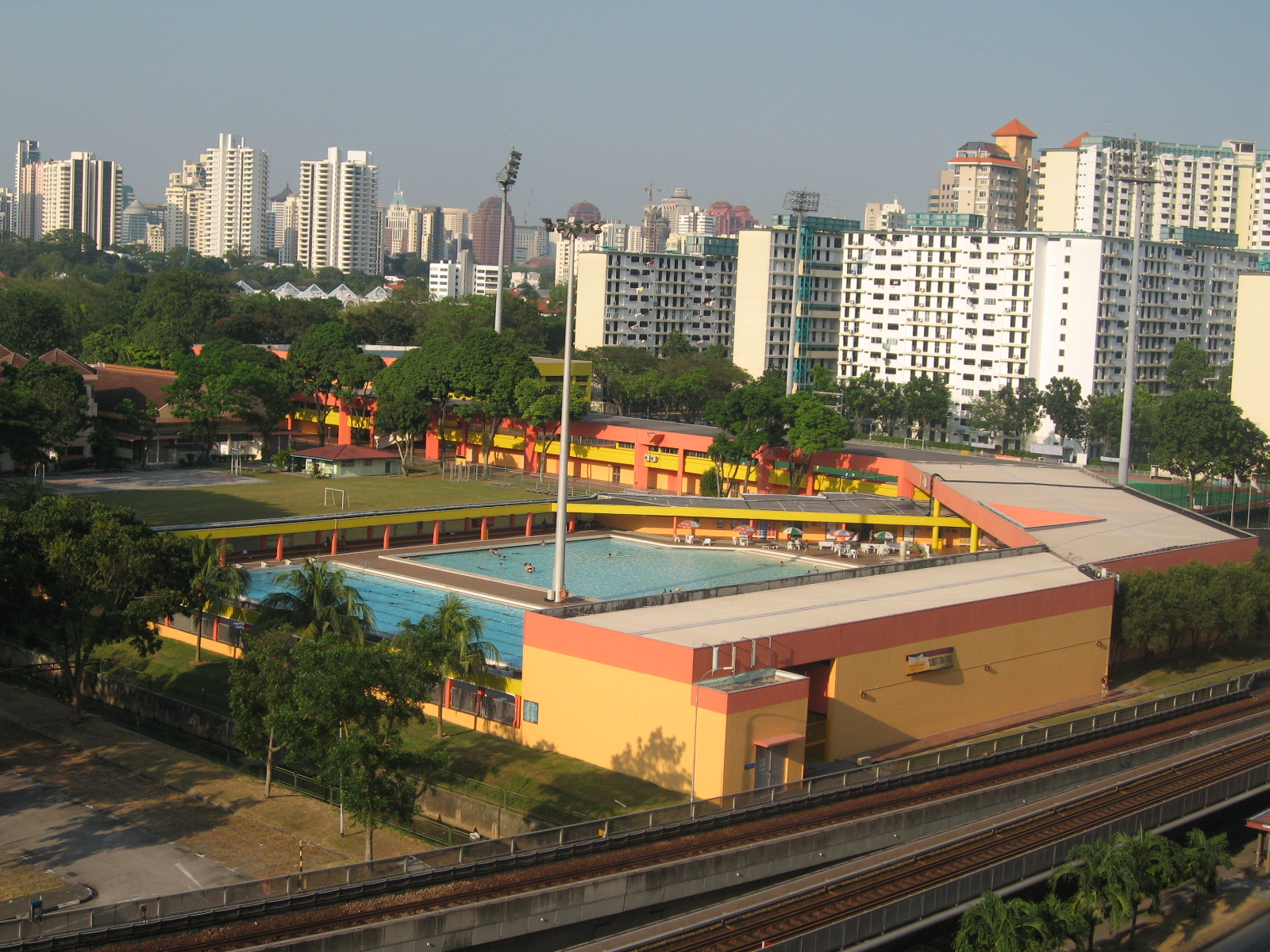
Delta Sports Complex

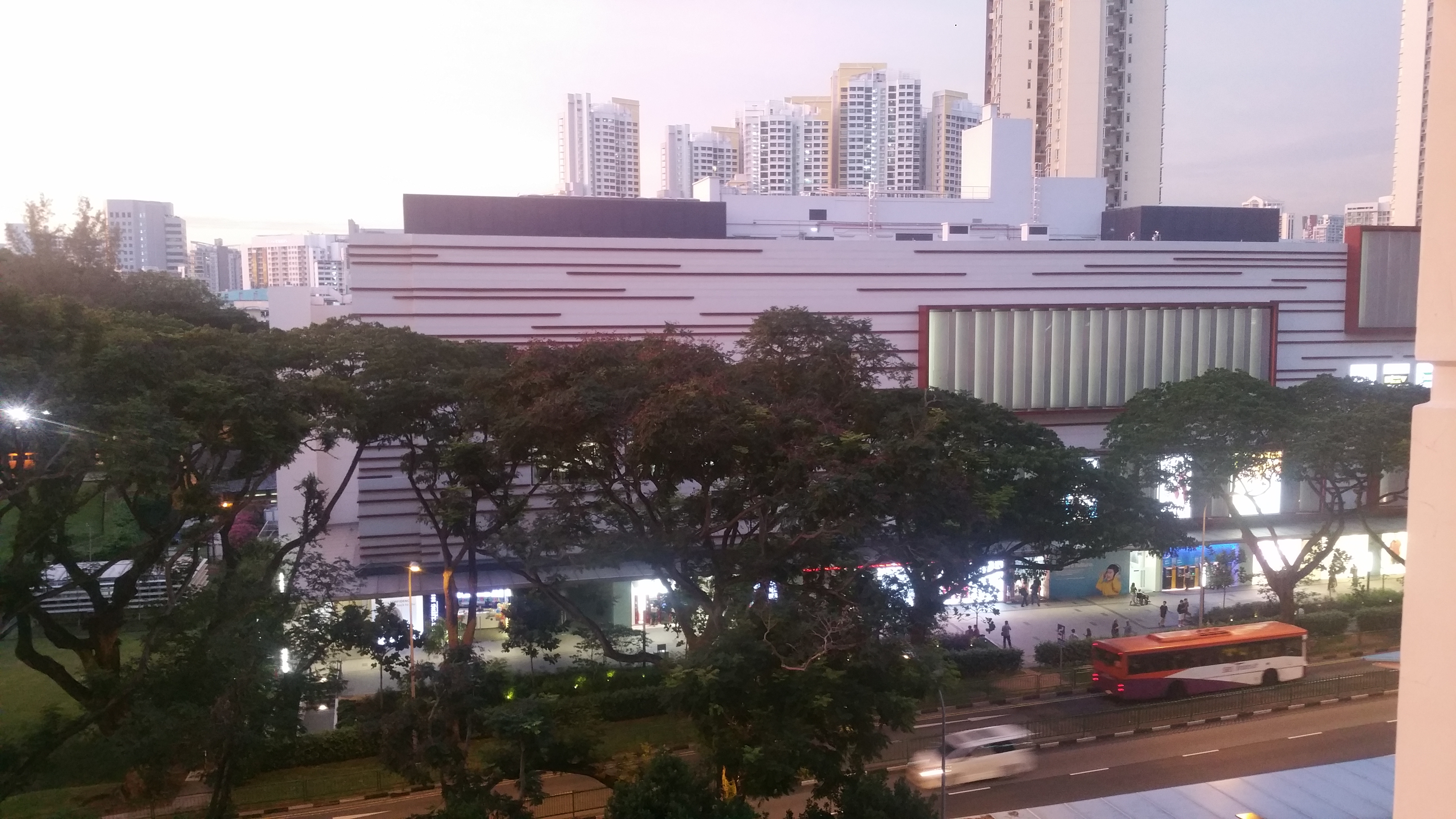
The main facade of Tiong Bahru Plaza, after its refurbishment in 2016.

=== Places of worship ===
==== Buddhist temples ====
- Wat Ananda Metyarama Thai Buddhist Temple
- Kwan Yam Theng Buddhist Temple
- Buddhist Fellowship West Centre, in Yeo's building

==== Chinese temples ====
- Ban Siew San Kuan Imm Temple (1880)
- Giok Hong Tian Temple (1887)
- Hock Teck Tong Temple (1932)
- Kai San Temple (1904)
- Kim Lan Beo Temple (1830, relocated in 1984)
- Leng San Teng Temple (1879)
- Koon Seng Ting Temple (1880)
- Lei Yin Temple (1957)
- Qi Tian Gong Temple (1920)
- Qi Tian Tan Temple (1949)
- Tai Yeong Kon Temple (1947)
- Tang Gah Beo Temple
- Telok Blangah Ting Kong Beo Temple (1923)

==== Chinese clan temples ====
- Lim See Tai Chong Soo Kiu Leong Tong Temple
- San Jiang Gong Ci Temple

==== Chinese combined temples ====
- Chia Leng Kong Heng Kang Tian Temple
- Chin Leng Keng (Leng San Teng, Chin Lin Keng & Ban Sian Beo)
- Temple of Liang Hong Sze Kong Hock Keng Heap Hoe Keng

==== Churches ====
- Grace Assembly of God 1
- Church of God Singapore
- Church of St. Teresa
- Danish Seamen's Church
- Grace Methodist Church
- Pasir Panjang Tamil Methodist Church
- St. Matthew's Church
- Telok Ayer Chinese Methodist Church

==== Hindu temples ====
- Sri Ruthra Kaliamman Temple

==== Mosques ====
- Masjid Al-Amin Mosque
- Masjid Jamiyah Ar-Rabitah Mosque
- Masjid Kampong Delta Mosque
- Masjid Temenggong Daeng Ibrahim

==== Sikh temples ====
- Gurdwara Sahib Silat Road

=== Shopping centres ===
- Alexandra Central
- Alexandra Retail Centre
- Concorde Shopping Centre
- Depot Heights Shopping Centre
- HarbourFront Centre
- Tiong Bahru Plaza
- VivoCity

=== Parks ===
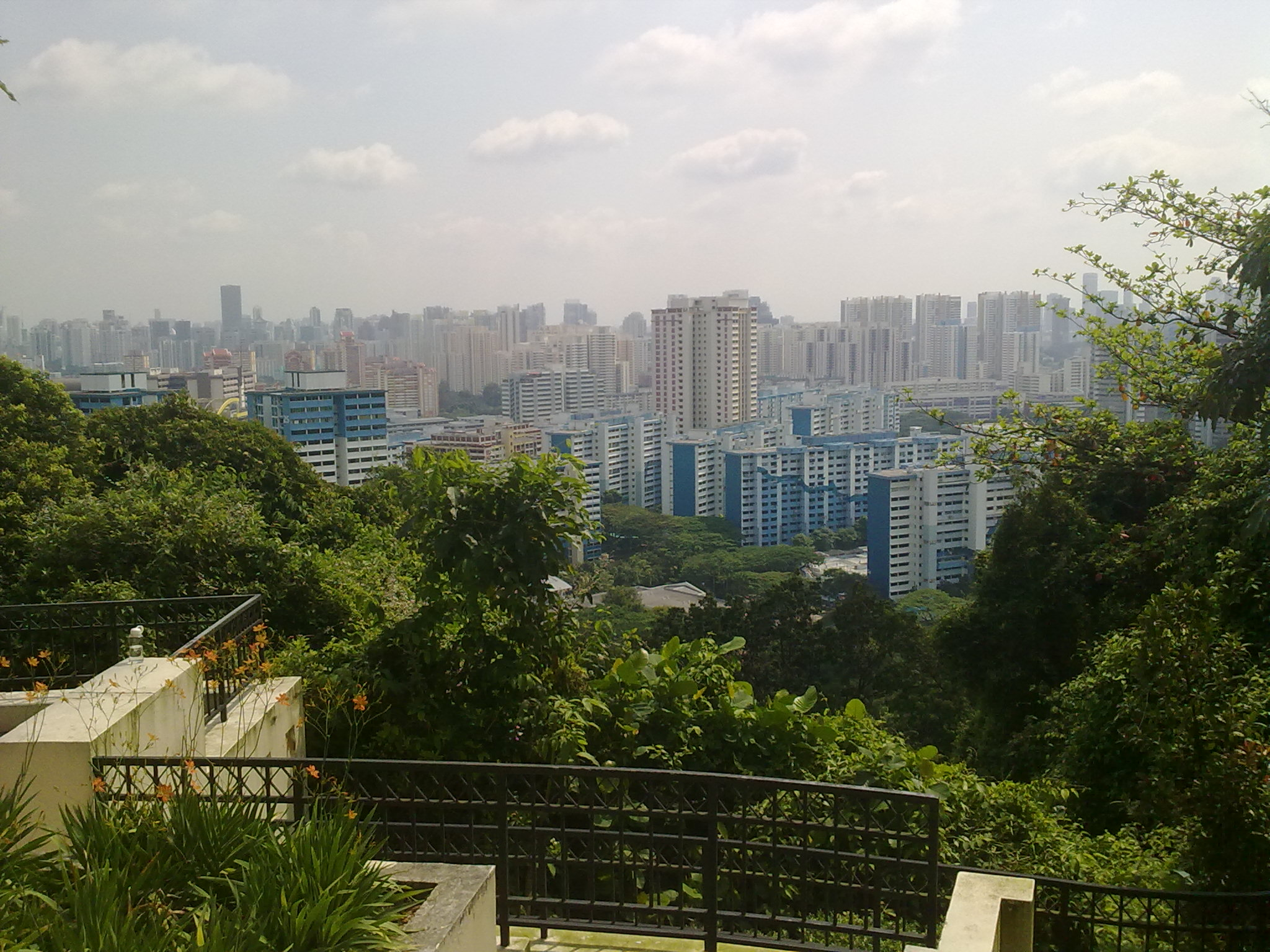
Panoramic view of Bukit Merah, with the Central Area in the background, from Mount Faber.

- Alexandra Canal Linear Park
- Alexandra Hill East Neighbourhood Park
- Bukit Purmei Hillock Park
- Henderson Park
- Kim Pong Park
- Labrador Nature Reserve
- Mount Faber Park
- Rail Corridor (South)
- Rumah Tinggi Eco Park
- Telok Blangah Hill Park
- Tiong Bahru Park

=== Community centres/clubs ===
- Bukit Merah Community Centre
- Henderson Community Club
- Kim Seng Community Centre
- Leng Kee Community Centre
- Radin Mas Community Club
- Telok Blangah Community Club
- Tiong Bahru Community Centre

=== Sports facilities ===
- Delta Sports Complex
- SAFRA Mount Faber
- Sports Lifestyle Centre

=== Tourist attractions ===
- Amped Trampoline Park
- Baba House
- Berlayer Beacon
- Bukit Chermin Broadwalk
- Former Tanjong Pagar Railway Station (Temporarily closed for restoration works)
- Gillman Barracks
- Henderson Waves
- Singapore Art Museum (SAM) at Tanjong Pagar Distripark
- Singapore Cable Car stations at Mount Faber and HarbourFront
- The SGH Museum

== Politics ==
Bukit Merah falls within six political divisions across four constituencies. A large portion of Bukit Merah is under Tanjong Pagar GRC with some areas under Jalan Besar GRC, Radin Mas SMC and Queenstown SMC, all served by the People's Action Party.

As of the 2025 General election, the Members of Parliament for Tanjong Pagar GRC are Foo Cexiang, Joan Pereira and Rachel Ong of Tanjong Pagar–Tiong Bahru, Henderson–Dawson and Telok Blangah divisions respectively, Josephine Teo for Kreta Ayer-Kim Seng division of Jalan Besar GRC, and Eric Chua and Melvin Yong of Queenstown and Radin Mas SMCs respectively. The area of Telok Blangah was previously part of the West Coast GRC from 1997 to 2025 until it was redrawn to Tanjong Pagar GRC, returning Telok Blangah back to the constituency since 1991, along with some portions redrawn into Radin Mas SMC as well.

== See also ==
- Kim Seng Road
- Jalan Bukit Merah
- Alexandra

== Sources ==
- Victor R Savage, Brenda S A Yeoh (2003), Toponymics – A Study of Singapore Street Names, Eastern Universities Press, ISBN 981-210-205-1
- https://lostnfiledsg.wordpress.com/2012/08/09/bukit-merah-town-centre/
- http://eresources.nlb.gov.sg/infopedia/articles/SIP_779_2005-01-26.html
