= Everton Park =

Everton Park may refer to:

- Everton Park, Queensland, Australia – a suburb of Brisbane
- Everton Park, Liverpool, England – a park
- Everton Park, Singapore, Singapore – a subzone of Bukit Merah
- Everton Stadium, future home ground of Everton Football Club
- Goodison Park, current home ground of Everton Football Club
