= Delta Sport Centre =

Sports complex in Singapore

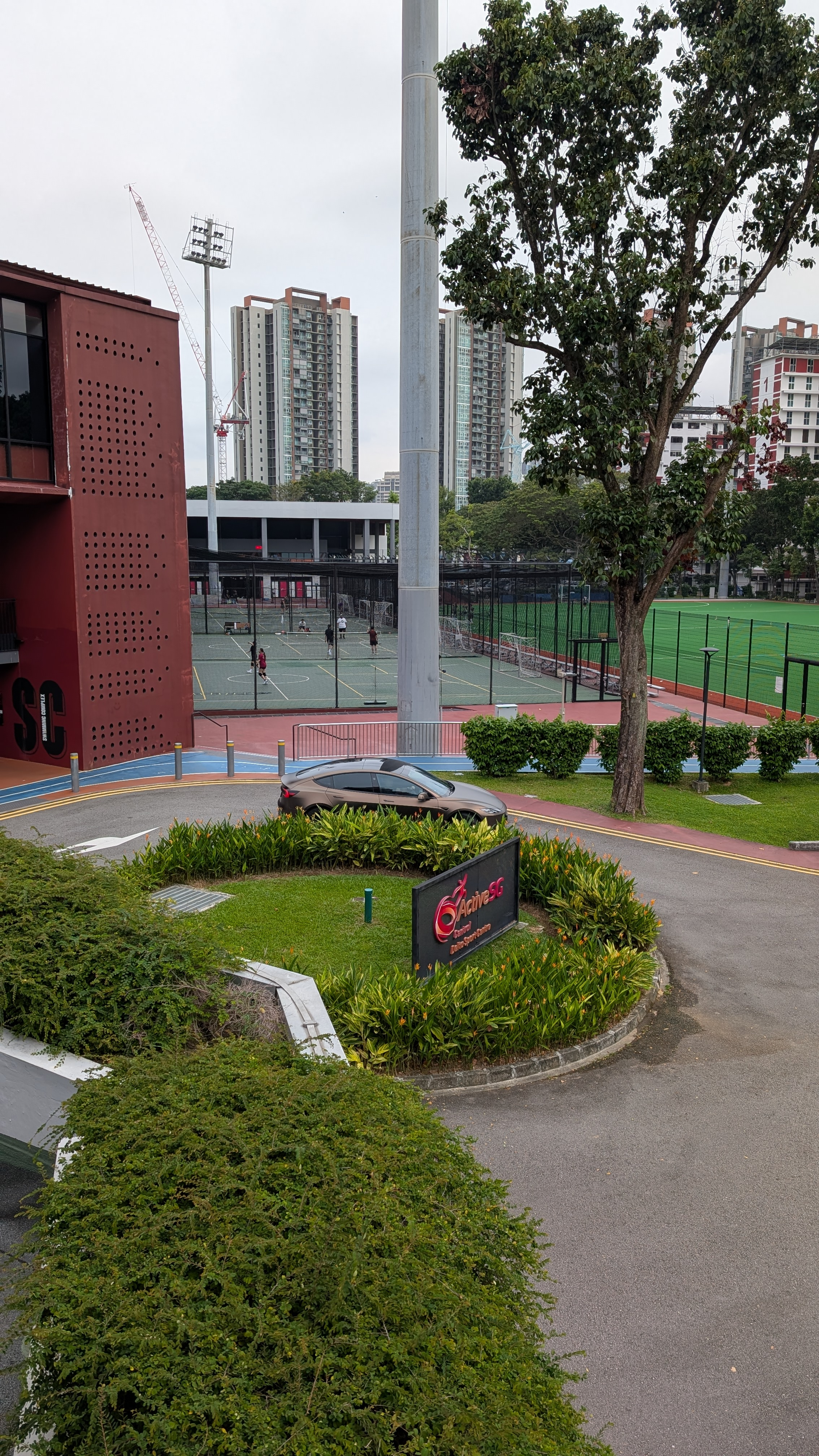
- Interactive map of Delta Sport Centre
- Address: 900 Tiong Bahru Rd, Singapore 158790
- Coordinates: 1.2900°N 103.8176°E

Delta Sport Centre, formerly known as Delta Sports Complex and Delta Sports and Recreation Centre, is located in Bukit Merah, Singapore. It is centrally located beside the Redhill MRT station. It also has a field hockey pitch, which has contributed to the local development of field hockey, with occasional competitions held there.

== History ==
The sports complex was opened to the public on 7 November 1979. The Delta Sports Complex facilities include the ActiveSG Gym, a swimming pool, a field hockey pitch, and an indoor sports hall.

The Singapore men's national field hockey team trained at the hockey pitch at Delta Sports Complex from 1991 to 2010, when they moved to Sengkang.

The public swimming facility was closed for renovation and upgrading on 1 September 2019. The renovation was oversaw by Red Bean Architects. It was delayed due to the COVID-19 pandemic, and was supposed to finally reopen on 31 July 2022.

On 30 April 2023, Delta Sport Centre officially reopened with a bigger gym, four new futsal courts, a full-sized hockey pitch, and three swimming pools.

== Awards ==
In 2025, Red Bean Architects received the Design of the Year award during the 15th President's Design (P*DA) Award for the renovation of the centre.

== Gallery ==
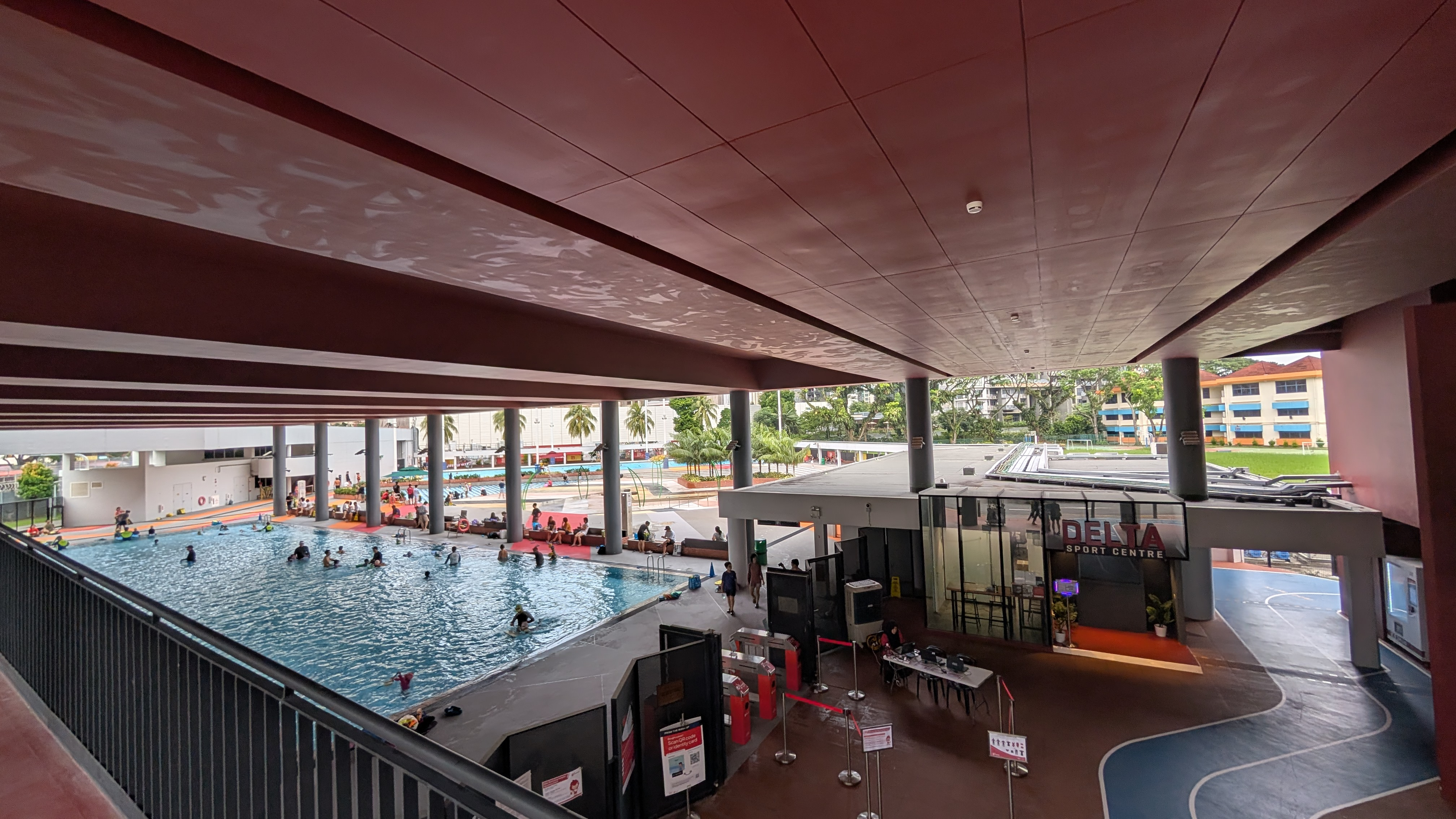
Swimming pools

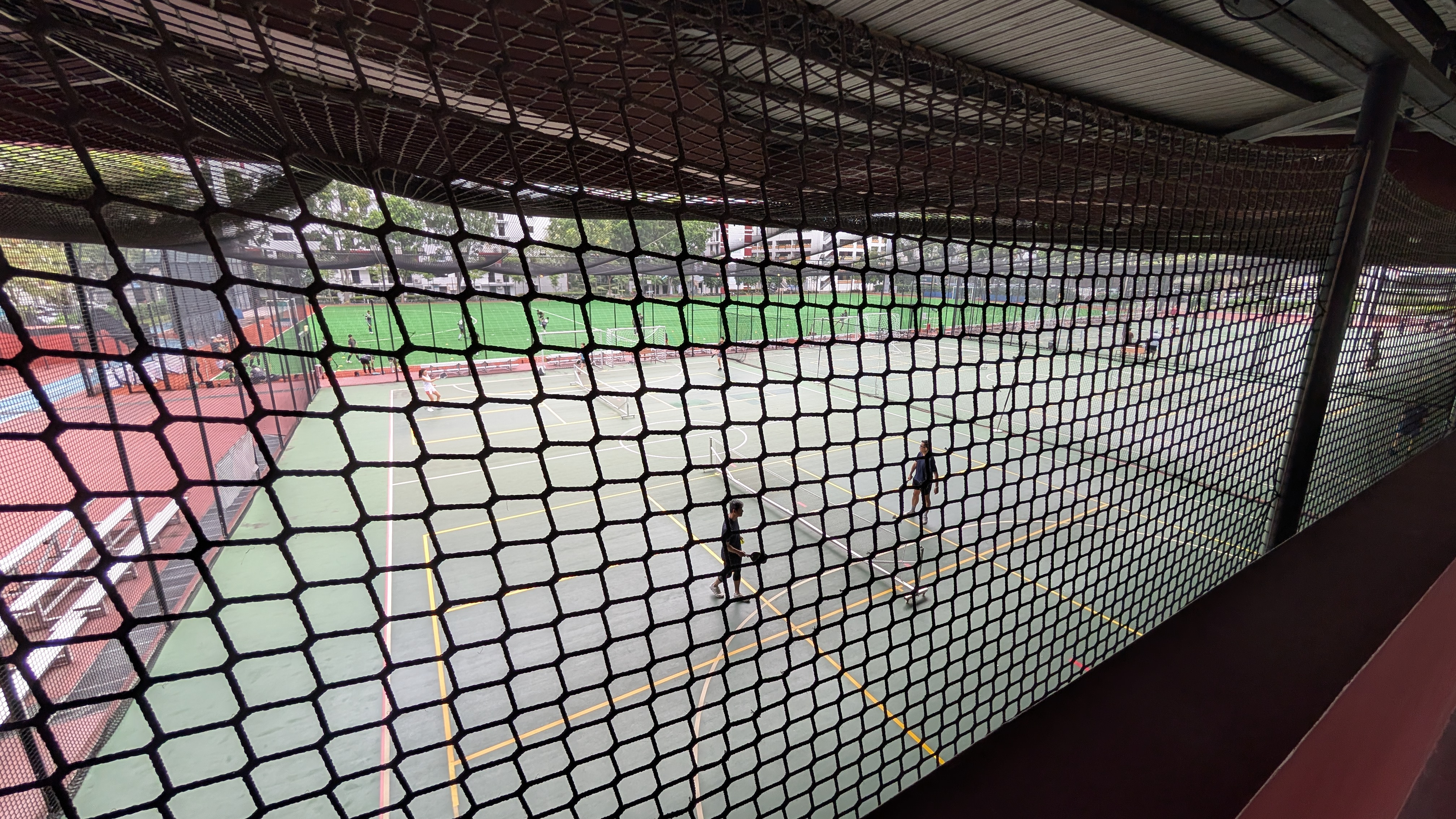
Hockey pitch and converted pickleball courts

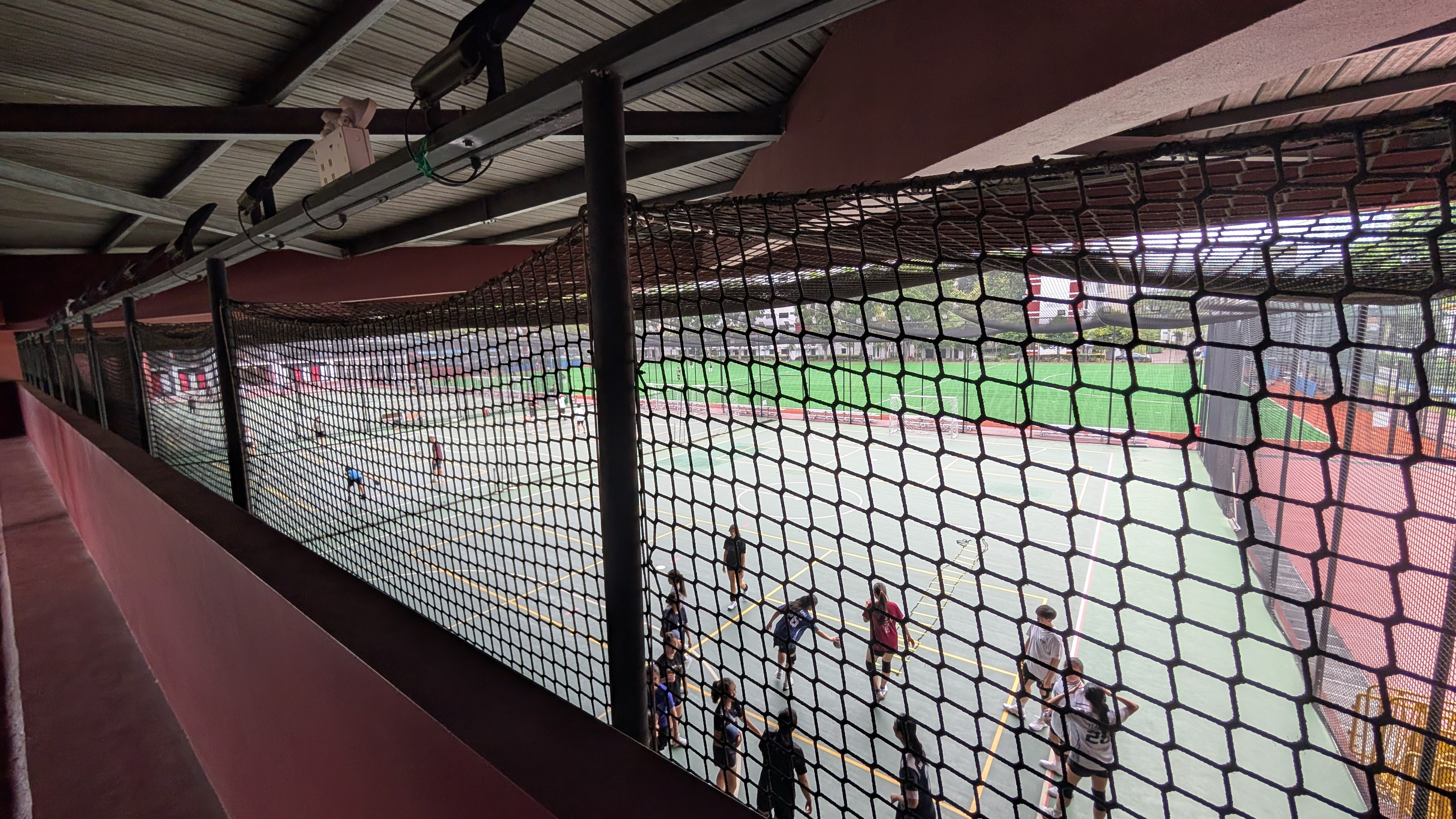
Converted Pickleball courts, futsal court and hockey pitch
