= Bukit Ho Swee fire =

1961 conflagration in Singapore

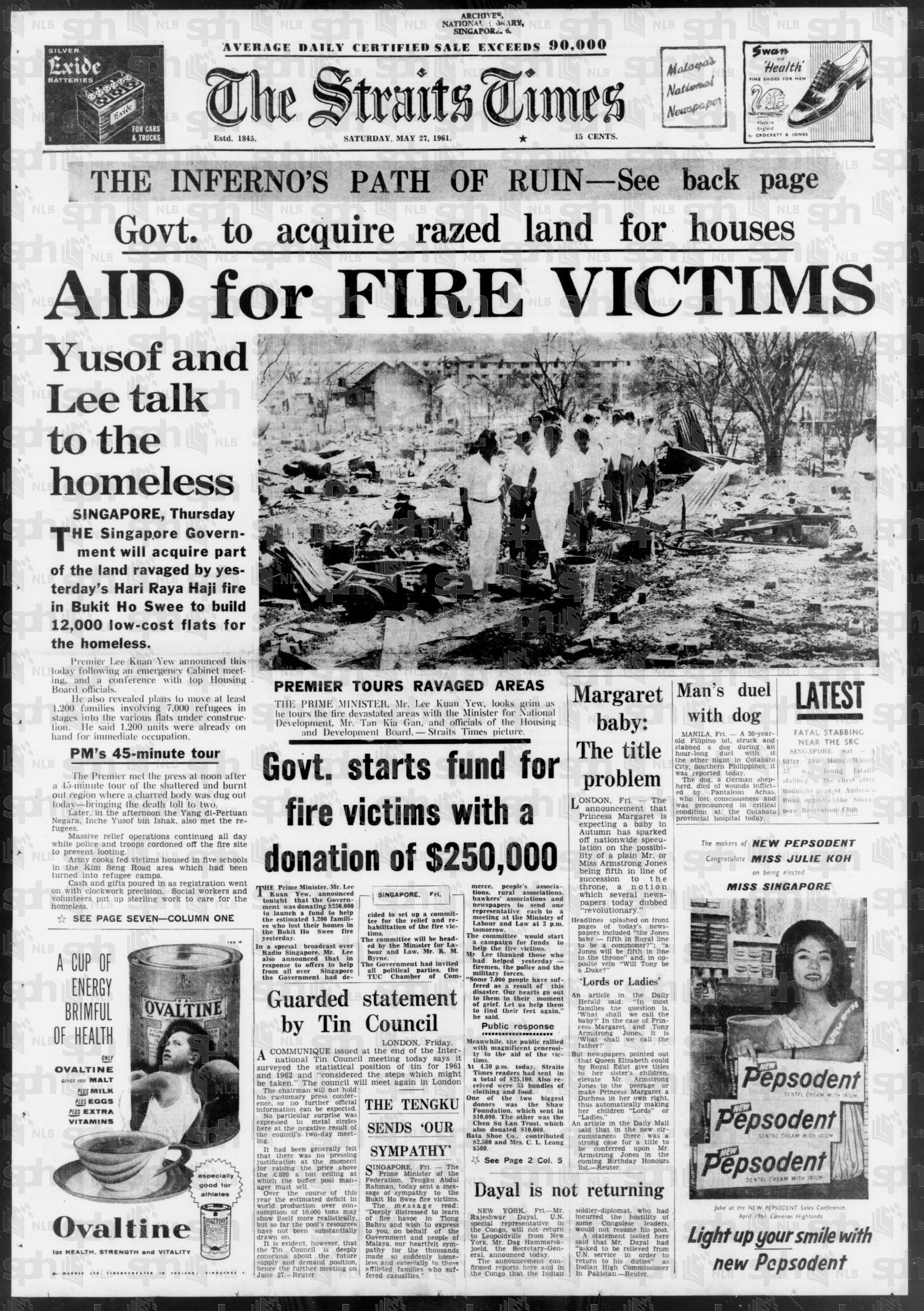
- The Straits Times front page two days after the fire
- Native name: 河水山大火; Kebakaran Bukit Ho Swee
- Date: 25 May 1961; 65 years ago
- Time: 3:30 pm (UTC+08:00)
- Duration: 3:30 pm – 10:00pm
- Location: Bukit Ho Swee, Singapore; 1°17′17″N 103°49′44″E
- Type: Conflagration
- Cause: Unknown
- Outcome: Around 16,000 people homeless; relocation of affected families to new houses
- Deaths: 4
- Injuries: 54
- Property damage: A school, a coffee mill, two oil mills, two junk shops, two tyre shops, three timber yards, three workshops, 2,800 houses razed

The Bukit Ho Swee fire (Note: Chinese: 河水山大火; pinyin: Héshuǐshān dàhuǒ; lit. 'Ho Swee Hill Great Fire', Malay: Kebakaran Bukit Ho Swee) was a conflagration that broke out in the squatter settlement of Bukit Ho Swee, Singapore on 25 May 1961. This fire resulted in 4 deaths and injured another 54. It also destroyed more than 2,800 houses around the Bukit Ho Swee area, leaving around 16,000 people homeless. The cause of this conflagration was never established. The Bukit Ho Swee fire was the biggest outbreak of fire in Singapore's history.

The fire was a pivotal point in Singapore's contemporary history. The scale of the destruction sparked an emergency project to swiftly construct accommodation and resettle the people affected by the disaster. This first public housing project, led by the newly formed Housing and Development Board (HDB), would eventually lead the way to the development of national public housing in future decades.

== Background ==
After World War II, many low-income Chinese families were forced to move out of Singapore's city centre. Coupled with the rise in the number of Chinese immigrants escaping from strife such as the Malayan Emergency, the situation created a huge demand for wooden housing built illegally on the fringes of the city-centre by profit-seeking contractors. As such, during the 1950s, urban kampongs became commonplace on the Singaporean landscape; one was located in Bukit Ho Swee. This kampong, seen by the People's Action Party (PAP) as "an insanitary, congested and dangerous squatter area", saw its population increase drastically from 2,772 people in 1948 to 19,017 people in 1957.

Meanwhile, the British colonial government in Singapore, through the Singapore Improvement Trust (SIT), embarked on the biggest public housing development project in the British Empire to support Singapore's industrialisation process. However, urban kampongs had to be cleared to free up land for the construction of public housing units, whose high rents, small size and acute shortage made them unpopular with residents of urban kampongs. Many kampong residents chose to remain, making relocations politically difficult. Relocations often had to be done under police escort; the city ultimately had to retract its demolition policy in 1955 and designated some kampongs as "attap" areas. However, relocations still took place outside of these designated areas. This public housing development project was later adopted by the Housing and Development Board when a PAP-led Singapore achieved self-governance under British rule.

=== Fire risk in kampongs ===
There were many fire hazards in kampongs. These included improperly disposed rubbish, burning of joss sticks and paper in religious rituals and the use of firewood for cooking. As such, major fires often broke out in kampongs. Prior to the Bukit Ho Swee fire, fires had already broken out in Kampong Bugis, Geylang and in nearby Kampong Tiong Bahru. Kampong Bukit Ho Swee itself had experienced a massive fire on 8 August 1934 when fires destroyed 500 houses in the area.

Despite the ever-present threat of fire, the firefighting team in Singapore was ill-prepared to deal with the threat. The firefighting force only had 25 officers, 37 subordinate officers and 370 firefighters to fight fires in the whole of Singapore. They were equipped to deal with fires in permanent structures rather than the temporary shelters that characterize urban kampongs. Traffic congestion in the city also delayed the brigade's response to any fire. Residents distrusted the fire service, which was notorious for pilfering from fire sites. They also associated the fire service negatively with re-development. Thus, people began sabotaging the fire brigade's job and belatedly inform them about fires, which diminished their effectiveness in putting out kampong fires.

However, the fire brigade was not totally inept. It had purchased water tenders which could draw water from sources such as wells and ponds and could safely navigate through narrow kampong roads. Volunteer firefighting squads, consisting of kampong residents and aided by the fire brigade and political parties governing the area, were formed. These squads were credited with helping to put out 15 fires in 1961 alone.

Such incidents of kampong fires provided opportunities for the government to rehouse kampong residents and redevelop the land. In the aftermath of these fires, the Singapore Improvement Trust often rehoused some victims in its flats as a form of emergency housing. However, these attempts at redevelopment were half-hearted in nature, and the challenges of obtaining the necessary land for redevelopment eventually stalled these programmes. In addition, the general kampong population did not buy into such resettlement plans as they did not consider such emergency housing to be any different from the wooden housing that they are accustomed to.

== Development of the fire ==
At 3:30 pm on 25 May 1961, a fire started in the neighbouring Kampong Tiong Bahru. Favourable wind conditions, the presence of flammable construction materials used by kampong residents to construct their attap houses and the presence of oil and petrol in homes caused the fire to spread quickly. The inferno soon engulfed the kampongs situated along Beo Lane, including Bukit Ho Swee, up until Havelock Road. This area, the most densely populated and developed area of the whole kampong, was where the fire inflicted the most significant damage. The fire spread to the Delta Circus area, where Ganges Avenue was sufficiently wide enough to act as a firebreak that prevented the fire from engulfing the government-built housing flats at Delta Estate.

As the fire occurred on the Hari Raya Haji public holiday, many members of the firefighting and police force had to be recalled to their duties through radio broadcasts from 5 pm onwards. The problem was made worse by the fact that many of the firefighters were Malay-Muslims who had taken leave to celebrate the festival. An hour later, the fledgling local military forces and British Army personnel were also called in to assist the police with maintaining order. In total, around 180 firemen, 20 officers and 22 fire engines were deployed to fight the fire, while nearly 1,000 army personnel were deployed to aid in crowd-control.

Firefighters faced many challenges in their attempts to contain the inferno. Initially, the water pressure from the fire hydrants was too low. The congested layout of the housing settlements around the area and the presence of curious on-lookers hampered the movements of the firefighters and slowed down the process of evacuation and cordoning of the affected area. Further complicating the firefighters' mission was the fact that processing plants and mills in Bukit Ho Swee had also caught on fire and exploded, causing toxic chemicals such as sulphuric acid to be released into the air.

The Bukit Ho Swee fire peaked around 8 pm; by then, 22 fire engines had been deployed. The fire was eventually extinguished around Delta Circle at around 10pm. Even after the flames were extinguished, the debris continued smouldering for much of the night.

== Death and destruction ==
Despite the scale of the fire, only four people were killed. However, the scale of destruction was massive as the fire gutted an area of approximately 100 acres. This included a school, a coffee mill, two oil mills, two junk shops, two tyre shops, three timber yards and three workshops. In addition, 2,800 homes were destroyed, leaving 15,694 people homeless. Given that the homeless people managed to escape with very few of their belongings, and their livestock such as chickens and pigs were destroyed in the fire, the fire also significantly damaged the local economy. The overall material damage caused by the fire is estimated at SGD$2 million. The scale of the disaster made this conflagration the worst in Singapore's history.

The blaze also had a significant social impact. Of the victims of the fire, over half were younger than 15 years of age. The Nanyang Siang Pau even commented that "The word 'homeless' is inadequate to describe the seriousness of this fire disaster".

== Aftermath ==
A national state of emergency was declared by the government shortly after the disaster. The schools in the area became temporary relief centres for approximately 8000 victims of the fire. Due to widespread looting in the aftermath of the fire, the army, police and the Gurkha Contingent blocked off access to the disaster site and imposed a partial curfew in the area. Access to the temporary shelters were also restricted.

A massive charity effort, led by the Social Welfare Department, began after the inferno. Organisations ranging from the British Army to volunteer organisations such as the Singapore Red Cross and Saint John's Ambulance Brigade came forward to assist the victims in the relief centres. The General Hospital set up a clinic in one of the relief centres in the area. Inmates of Changi, Pulau Senang and Outram prisons also helped to raise funds and prepared meals for the victims of the Bukit Ho Swee fire. This relief effort was later described by the Social Welfare Department as "the greatest challenge ever to be met in its fifteen-year-old span of existence".

Two days after the fire, the Bukit Ho Swee Fire National Relief Fund Committee was established by the government to collect the donations on behalf of the victims of the fire. The committee, headed by Minister for Labour and Law Kenneth Michael Byrne, collected donations from both the government sources and the general public. The government itself contributed $250,000 to this fund, while the Federation of Malaya donated $20,000. Rubber magnate Lee Kong Chian contributed $25,000 to this fund. Members of the general population such as taxi drivers, barbers and trishaw riders also made their donations. In total, the fund collected $1,586,422.16, of which $1.4 million had been passed on to the victims by 1961.

=== Relocation of residents ===
In the aftermath of the Bukit Ho Swee fire, the government gave priority to plans to relocate victims to permanent flats, as it deemed conditions at relief centres unsanitary. It announced a resettlement plan the day after the fire, and it promised to rehouse all the victims of the fire within a year. During a special sitting of the Legislative Assembly, the government passed a motion to acquire the entire Bukit Ho Swee area to construct low-cost housing for the victims. In the meantime, a portion of the victims were resettled in recently completed flats in Queenstown, St. Michael and Tiong Bahru. Approximately 6,000 victims were eventually relocated in this first phase of resettlement, dubbed "Operation Shift". On 4 June 1961, ten days after the disaster, the victims of the fire began relocating from the temporary relief shelters to their new one- or two-room flats. By 10 June, all victims had moved out of temporary shelters.

The government then built the first five blocks of 768 flats in 9 months. During the next four years, over 8,000 flats were built and those who lost their homes were able to return.

However, not all of the victims were willing or able to move into government-built flats, and instead chose to move into undamaged houses in the original kampong. A squatter settlement, a bit smaller than the original kampong, thus remained in the locality. In 1968, the new settlement caught fire again, rendering 3,000 people homeless. Most of the fire's victims were rehoused within a day.

== Investigations ==
Even before the fire was extinguished, rumours of arson were already spreading rapidly. Some eyewitnesses reportedly saw "young Chinese men" throwing flaming torches onto the roof of an attap house. On 28 May, Nanyang Siang Pau reported that the Criminal Investigation Department had questioned 2 residents living near the epicenter of the fire. By early June, the Department had questioned over 10 eyewitnesses regarding the fire. On 9 June, the police had arrested a suspect, but he was subsequently released due to the lack of concrete evidence supporting the eyewitness testimonies. After this report, there was no further coverage of the investigation into the cause of the fire. In addition to arson, other speculated causes of the Bukit Ho Swee fire include a gangster fight gone wrong and fire from a cooking stove. The cause of the fire has remained a mystery to the present day.

=== Conspiracy theories ===
The lack of a clear conclusion has led to speculation by some that the fire was started by the newly minted local government, led by the PAP. It was suggested that because the government faced difficulties in persuading residents to move out from their kampongs, it deliberately started this fire to forcibly move residents out. Purported evidence cited in support of this theory included the fact that even though the fire took place on a public holiday when many residents were home, the death toll remained relatively low. Others have dismissed this theory as "wild talk". These people argued that because the fire would have created a huge burden on the government to deal with the social fallout resulting from this event, it would not have made sense for the government to start this fire.

Official sources largely do not refer to the unresolved cause of the fire and archival materials regarding the Bukit Ho Swee fire in government archives are difficult for researchers to access. Interviewees regarding the fire were wary about speculating on the reason of the fire, and distanced themselves from directly alleging arson, preferring to accept "due process of the law over the words between neighbours". Rumours about the causes of the Bukit Ho Swee fire remain a sensitive topic for decades. However, the death of Lim Kim San in 2006 brought the debate over the cause of the Bukit Ho Swee fire to the public sphere.

== Legacy ==
Nevertheless, the Bukit Ho Swee fire was a major political victory for the governing PAP. The sheer speed of construction at Bukit Ho Swee, with 3.5 housing units completed per day, demonstrated to the population that the party was able to deliver. The political capital it gained as a result enabled the party-led government to rebuild other "black areas", kampongs which are similar to the one in Bukit Ho Swee. By 1965, the Housing Development Board successfully accommodated 23% of the population in its housing estates.

The PAP leveraged on the Bukit Ho Swee fire and the subsequent emergency construction of public housing for its political purposes. It used photographs of the newly completed public housing flats to showcase the progress of Singapore, demonstrating to both locals and the international community how Singapore had transformed a place filled with dangerous settlements into a modern development that could provide immaculate and safe housing for its people.

An Institute of Policy Studies (IPS) study in 2015 found that 70.7% of more than 1,500 people surveyed know of this event.

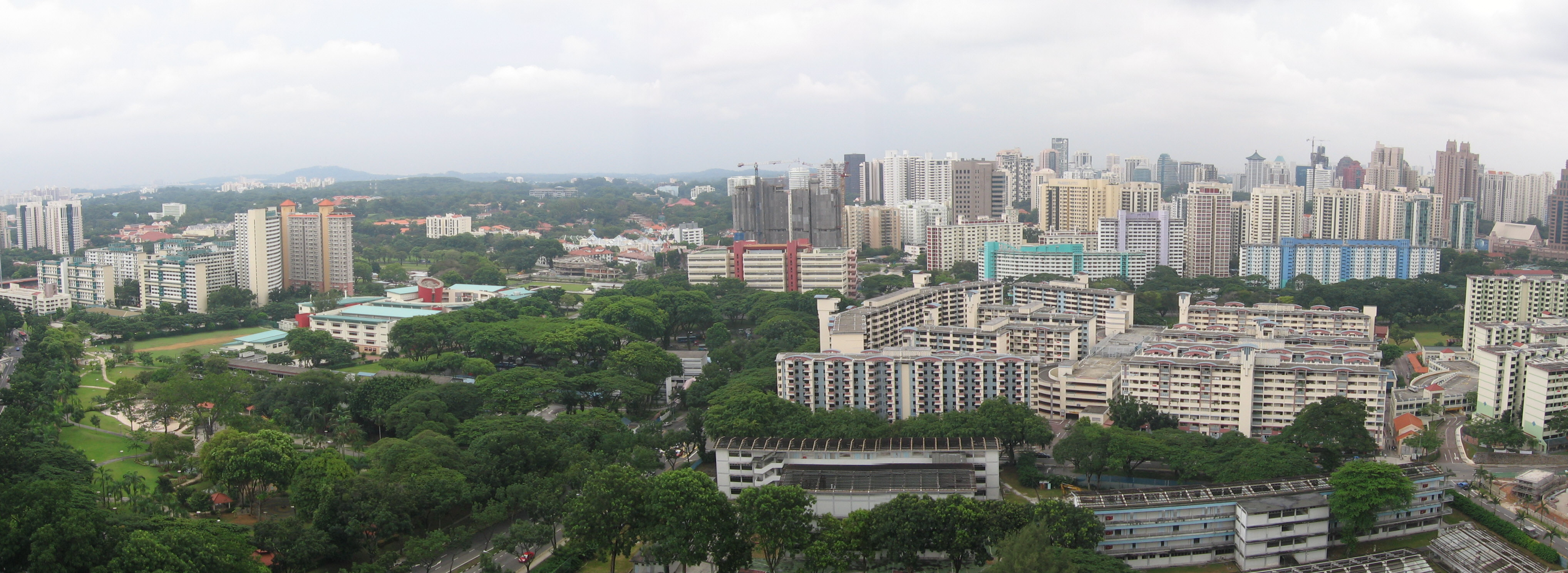
Bukit Ho Swee in 2006. From left to right: Hendersonville Housing Estate, Gan Eng Seng School and Bukit Ho Swee Housing Estate. River Valley lies in the background.

== In popular culture ==
Channel News Asia aired a documentary about the Bukit Ho Swee fire as part of its "Days of Disaster" documentary series on pivotal disasters in Singapore history. The hour-long episode, which first aired on 8 February 2015, used techniques such as computer-generated imagery and interviews with individuals to document this event.

The Bukit Ho Swee fire became the subject of works by several Singaporean artists such as Koeh Sia Yong in the 1960s. Channel 8, a Singaporean free-to-air Mandarin broadcaster, used the Bukit Ho Swee fire as a backdrop to its 2002 television series Bukit Ho Swee. The 29-episode drama revolved around the themes of neighbourliness and social danger, depicting a love story juxtaposed against a society where gangsters harass the socially-marginalised residents of the village.

It has also appeared in the last episode of Mediacorp drama The Journey: Tumultuous Times.
