= Tiong Bahru Park =

Park in Singapore

- Location within Singapore
- Type: Community Park
- Location: 1 Henderson Road; Tiong Bahru, Singapore
- Coordinates: 1.2873698°N 103.8246836°E
- Area: 3.3 hectares (33,000 m^{2})
- Manager: National Parks Board
- Operator: National Parks Board
- Status: Open
- Public transit: EW17 Tiong Bahru

Tiong Bahru Park is a public park between Henderson, Bukit Merah and Lower Delta Road in Singapore. First developed around 1967, it combined with a nursery site in 1977 and in 2000, it was redeveloped.

== See also ==
- List of Parks in Singapore
- National Parks Board
