= Bukit Ho Swee =

- Subzone of Bukit Merah Planning Area

Other transcription(s)
  - Chinese: 河水山; Hô-súi-soaⁿ; Ho4 Seoi2 Saan1
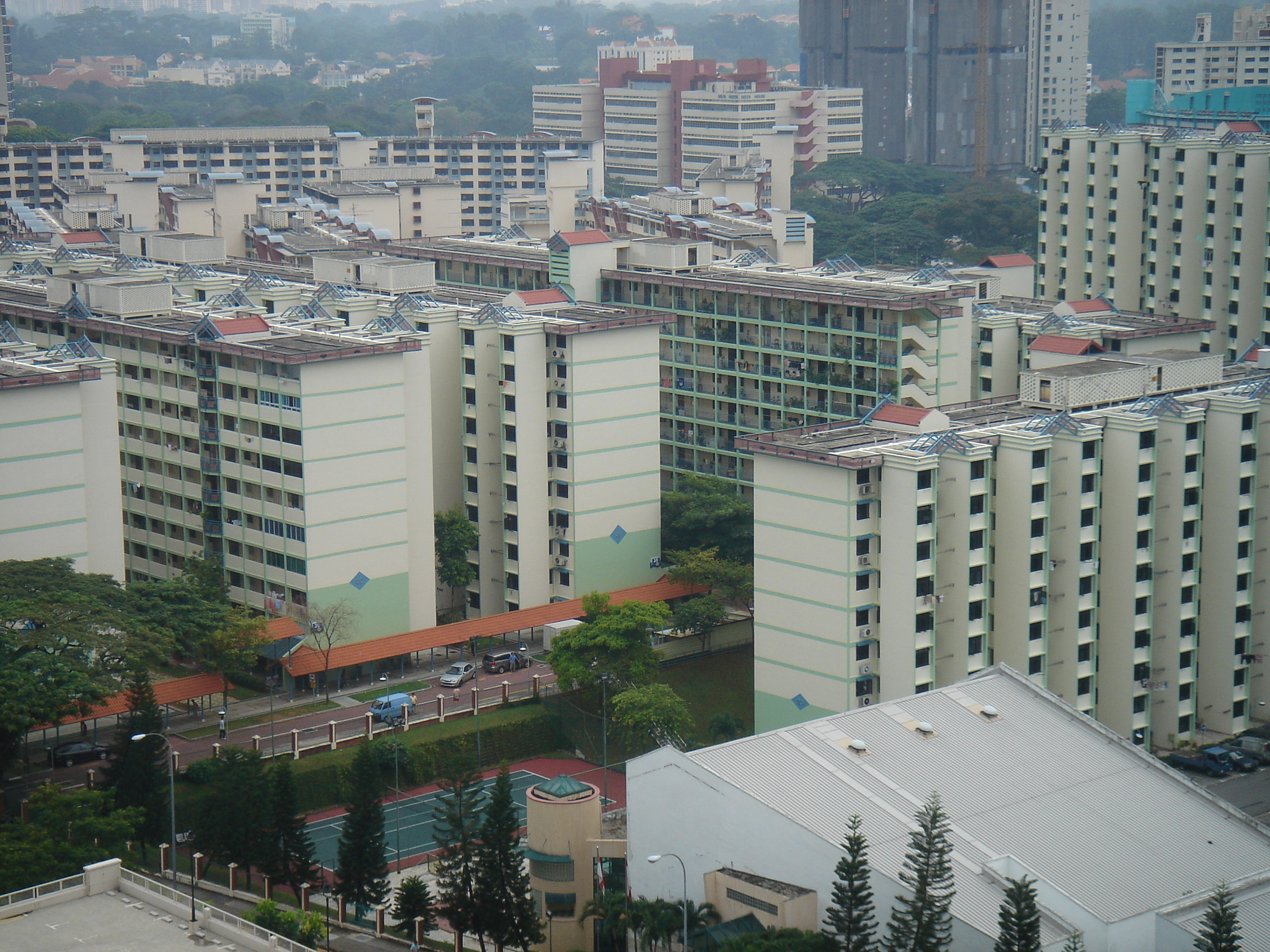
- Bukit Ho Swee residential estate
- Interactive map of Bukit Ho Swee
- Coordinates: 1°17′19″N 103°49′47″E
- Country: Singapore
- Region: Central Region
- Planning Area: Bukit Merah

Government
  - Members of Parliament: Jalan Besar GRC: Josephine Teo

Bukit Ho Swee (Chinese: 河水山; Pe̍h-ōe-jī: Hô-súi-soaⁿ; Jyutping: Ho4 Seoi2 Saan1) is a subzone within the planning area of Bukit Merah, Singapore, as defined by the Urban Redevelopment Authority (URA). Its boundary is made up of the Alexandra Canal in the north; Kim Seng Road and Outram Road in the east; Zion Road and Jalan Bukit Ho Swee in the south; Delta Road and Lower Delta Road in the west.

== Etymology ==
The name Bukit Ho Swee derives from both Malay and Hokkien: Bukit is Malay for hill, and Ho Swee commemorates Tay Ho Swee (鄭河水; Tēⁿ Hô-súi) (1834‍–‍1903), an influential Chinese opium and spirit farmer, timber merchant and ship owner. He was also the son of Tay Han Leong, the first opium and spirit dealer in Singapore. When Bukit Ho Swee got its official name in 1907, it was an area with many plank and attap houses.

== History ==
Bukit Ho Swee had a prominent Chinese community dating back to the days when Singapore was under British rule. Built over with wood frame huts with thatched roofs, it was an unplanned self-built township of about 20,000. Its rabbit warren of narrow lanes, passable only to pedestrians, made it an ideal base for gangs who could escape police pursuit which was too dangerous.

A major fire broke out on 25 May 1961 and the wooden huts were completely destroyed. Unlike previous kampong fires, the inferno managed to spread across two roads, and destroying the homes of nearly 16,000 people. The scale of this fire far surmounted all previous fires. This includes the great fire of February 1959 at Kampong Tiong Bahru, which happened just across the main road from Bukit Ho Swee, a fire that rendered 5,000 people homeless. A second fire that broke out seven years later wiped out the rest of Kampong Bukit Ho Swee. It swept across some 200 houses and caused 3,000 people to lose their homes. The recently constituted Housing and Development Board (HDB) moved in quickly to construct low-cost housing in the form of apartment blocks. Since these were easily patrolled by the police, gang power and influence waned.

As part of the HDB's plan to move locals out of squatters into "estates", a school was opened to serve the residents. Bukit Ho Swee Secondary School opened in 1967 and was located at Lower Delta Road. In 1991 it merged with the now defunct Tiong Bahru Secondary School (est. 1966), located several minutes' walk away. The site is now occupied by PSB Academy Delta campus.

=== Dwellings ===
Much of the housing in Bukit Ho Swee that existed at that time consisted of mainly one-room emergency flats and slightly bigger self-contained two room flats. A one-room rental emergency flat would cost roughly 20 dollars a month while a bigger two-room would cost only 4,000 dollars to buy. Citizens often squeezed their entire families in these tiny flats – studies have shown that at one time there could be up to 10 people living in the small space. Other bigger families would resort to splitting the family between two flats.

== Amenities ==
Bukit Ho Swee is now a residential estate and little remains of its chaotic past. Tiong Bahru MRT station on the East West Line is the nearest MRT station from the western parts of Bukit Ho Swee while Havelock MRT station on the Thomson–East Coast Line is nearer to the eastern parts of Bukit Ho Swee. Nearby schools and educational institutions include Alexandra Primary School, Zhangde Primary School, Gan Eng Seng School, Outram Secondary School and the Duke-NUS Graduate Medical School. There are two hawker centres in Bukit Ho Swee, namely Beo Crescent Market and Havelock Cooked Food Centre. There also various shops along the shophouses of Havelock Road. There is a 24-hour NTUC FairPrice supermarket located in the ground level of block 50.

The entire Bukit Ho Swee town, and its neighbouring areas such as Delta Avenue estate and Indus Road is currently managed by Jalan Besar Town Council.

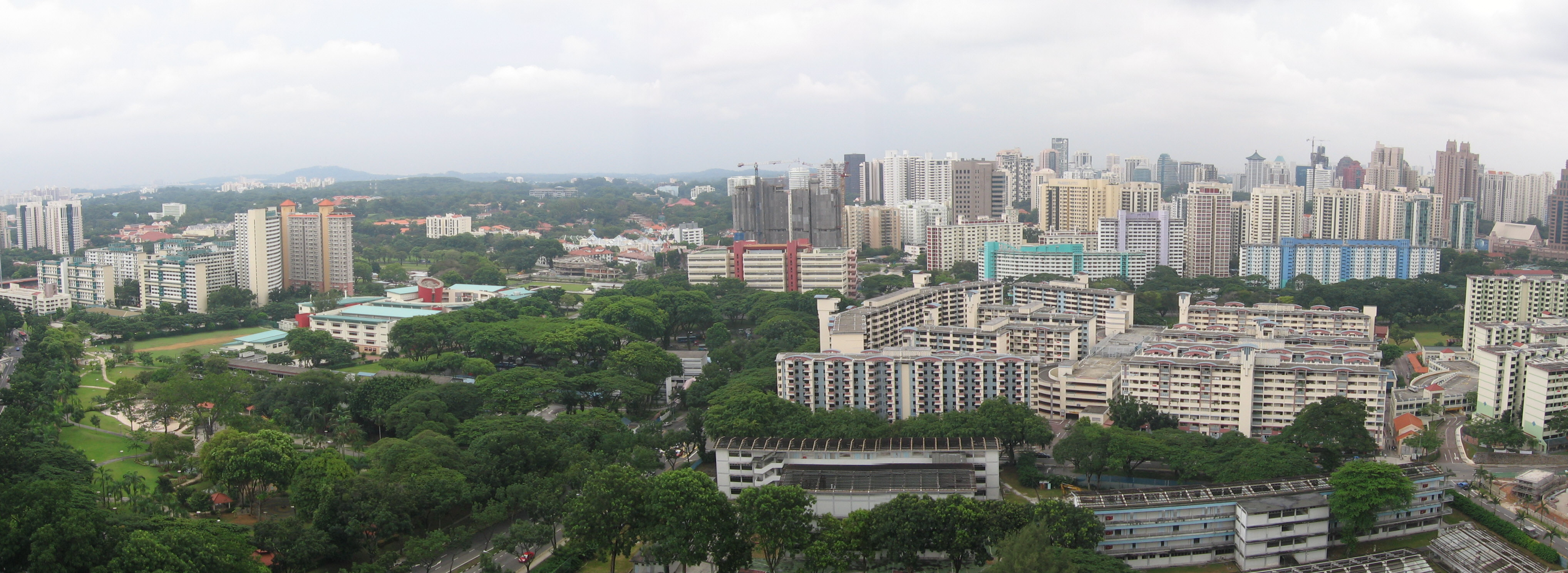
Bukit Ho Swee today. From left to right: Hendersonville Housing Estate, Gan Eng Seng Secondary School and Bukit Ho Swee Housing Estate. River Valley lies in the background.
