= Everton Park, Singapore =

Everton Park
- Subzone of Bukit Merah Planning Area

Other transcription(s)
  - Chinese: 艾弗顿园
- Interactive map of Everton Park
- Coordinates: 1.2768°N 103.8370°E
- Country: Singapore
- Region: Central Region
- Planning Area: Bukit Merah

Everton Park (Chinese: 艾弗顿园) is a subzone within the planning area of Bukit Merah, Singapore, as defined by the Urban Redevelopment Authority (URA). Its boundary is made up of New Bridge Road and Eu Tong Sen Street in the north; Kampong Bahru Road in the west; the Ayer Rajah Expressway (AYE) in the south; and Cantonment Road in the east.

Everton Park also refers to a minor road within the subzone. The subzone took its name from this road.
