= Cantonment Road, Singapore =

Road in Singapore

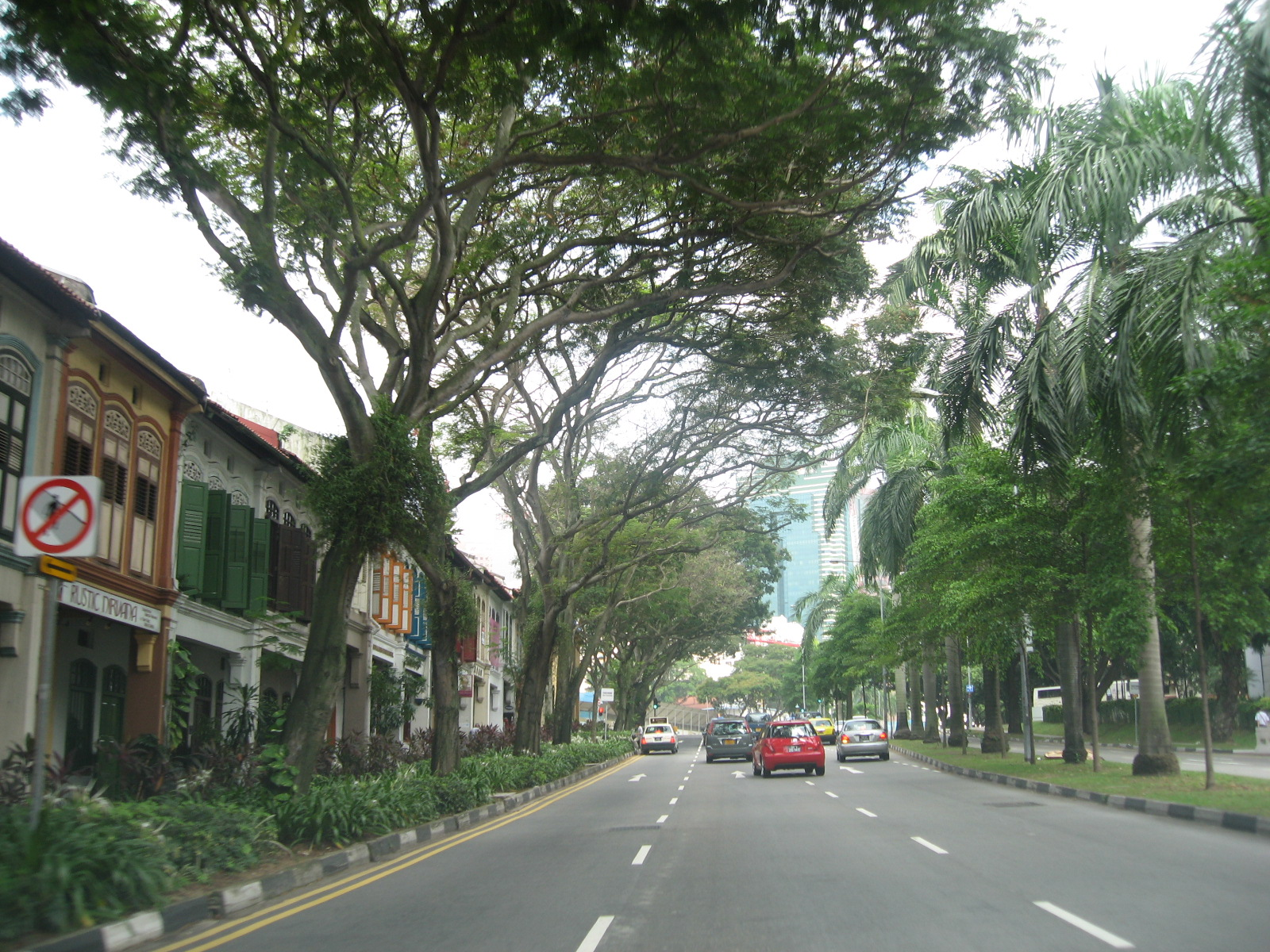
Cantonment Road as seen from Chinatown, Outram. The right lane is located in Everton Park, Bukit Merah.

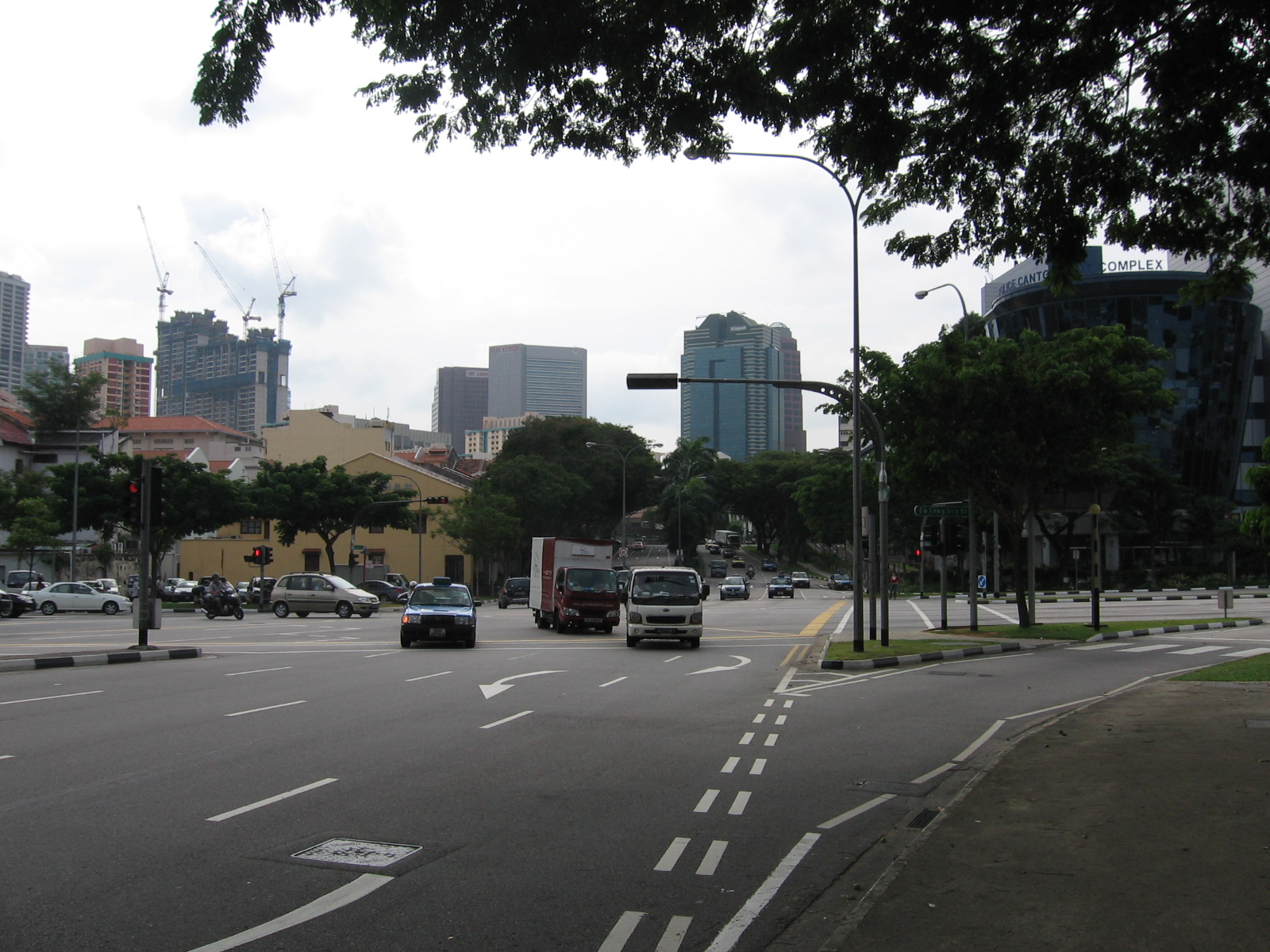
The junction of Cantonment Road with Outram Road, Eu Tong Sen Street and New Bridge Road as viewed from Bukit Merah.

Cantonment Road (Chinese: 广东民路) is a road located directly on the boundary between Bukit Merah and the Central Area PAs of Outram and the Downtown Core in Singapore.

The road starts at its junction with Outram Road, Eu Tong Sen Street, and New Bridge Road in the north and ends at its junction with Keppel Road in the south. It is intersected by the arterial Neil Road.

Namesake roads include Cantonment Link, a one-way road which connects Keppel Road to Cantonment Road, and Cantonment Close.

The Police Cantonment Complex and The Pinnacle@Duxton, a 50-storey residential development in Singapore's city center, is located along the road.

== Etymology and history ==
One of the interesting landmark along Cantonment Road is the Lim's Ancestral Temple, known as Lim See Tai Chong Soo Kiu Leong Tong (林氏大宗祠九龙堂家). The ancestral temple was founded in 1928, the main purpose of this ancestral temple is to conduct the ancestral worship of the Lim's ancestors and Mazu (天后圣姑), whom they regarded as their Grand-Auntie. One of the temple's founder is the wealthy Nan'an businessman called Lim Loh (林路), who is the father of war hero Lim Bo Seng.

== See also ==
- Police Cantonment Complex
