= Tiong Bahru Plaza =

Shopping center in Tiong Bahru, Singapore

- 中峇鲁广场
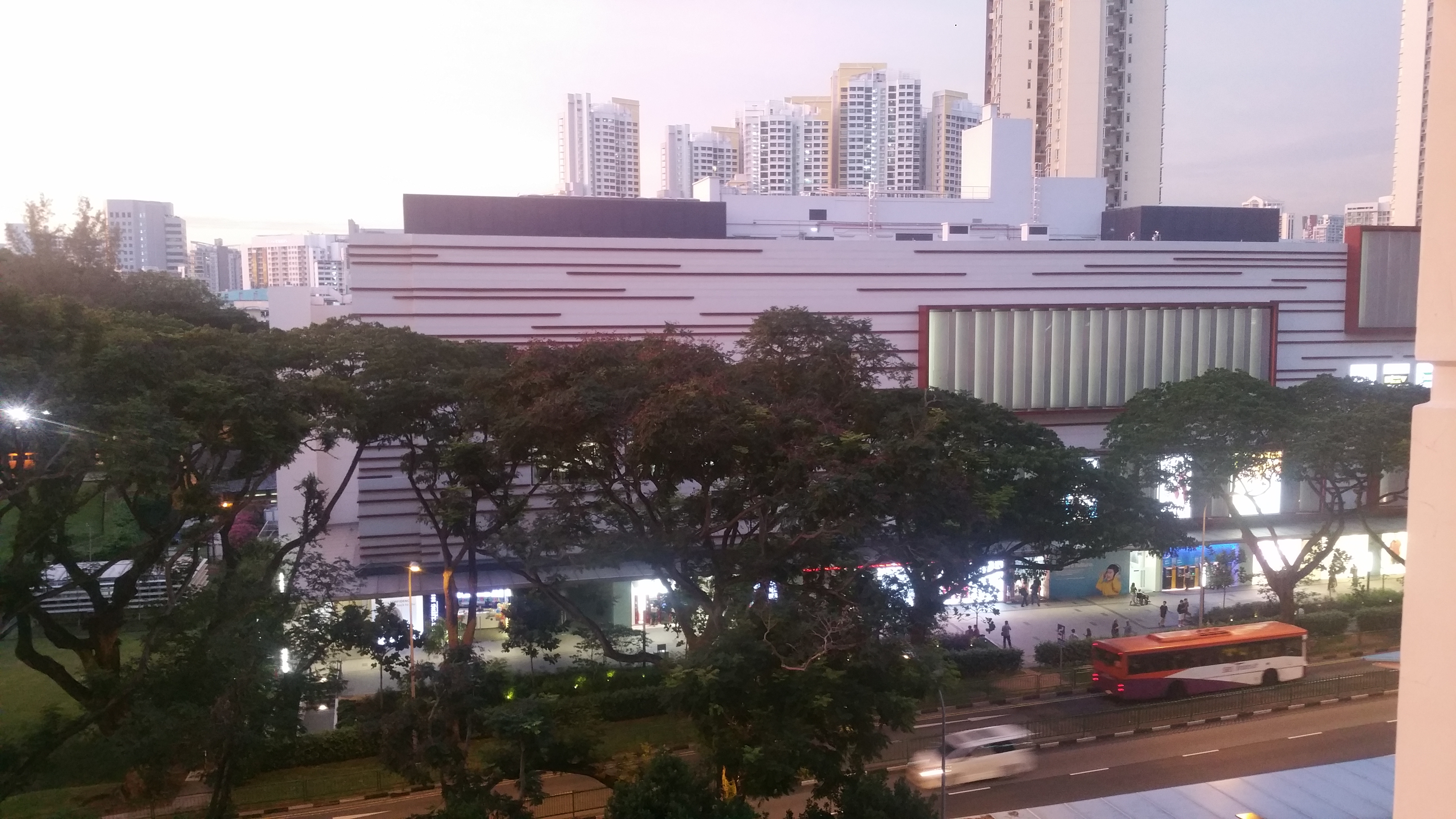
- Exterior view of Tiong Bahru Plaza after upgrading.
- Location: Tiong Bahru Road, Singapore
- Coordinates: 1.2865°N 103.8272°E
- Address: 302 Tiong Bahru Road, Singapore 168732
- Opened: November 1994
- Developer: UOL Limited
- Manager: Frasers Property
- Owner: Frasers Property
- Num. of stores: 167 (6 levels inclusive of 1 basement level)
- Num. of anchor tenants: 5
- Floor area: 190,618 square feet (17,709.0 m^{2})
- Floors: 9 (6 shopping floors, 3 carpark floors)
- Public transit: EW17 Tiong Bahru
- Website: Tiong Bahru Plaza

Tiong Bahru Plaza (Simplified Chinese: 中峇鲁广场) is a shopping mall located in the Tiong Bahru Estate of Bukit Merah, Singapore, at 302 Tiong Bahru Road, near Bukit Ho Swee Crescent. It consists of a 20-storey office tower block (Central Plaza), and a 6-storey shopping and entertainment complex, with 3 basement carparks. The mall is also directly linked to Tiong Bahru MRT station of the East West MRT line, which is accessible from Exit B of the station.

The suburban mall has a total of 167 shops spread across 6 floors.

== History ==
Developed by UOL Limited, Tiong Bahru Plaza and the adjacent 20-storey office tower, Central Plaza, were completed in late 1994 as the first shopping mall in Tiong Bahru and Bukit Merah. Like a typical suburban mall at that time, it had a cinema, a department store, a supermarket, a food court, and more than 100 specialty shops. In 2003, the mall was sold to ARMF Pte Ltd.

In 2005, the mall commenced renovation works, including converting the entire Basement 1 carpark into retail space and creating connections to the MRT station. In addition, the tenant mix was refreshed as well.

In 2015, Tiong Bahru Plaza underwent a major revamp costing $90 million, changing the external facade, increasing retail space and connecting the mall to the office tower. In August 2015, the mall shut its doors for extensive renovation works and reopened in March 2016. It also added a new playground on the 3rd floor, an updated tenant mix with new retail concepts on all floors, these include Golden Village, Uniqlo, Rubi Shoes and Miniso. An outdoor plaza for events was also created on the ground floor of the mall. In 2017, the mall’s digital directories were affected by ransomware attacks, just before the NETS breakdown on 5 February 2018. Citing declining demand, Rubi Shoes closed down on 12 November 2018 after lasting 2.5 years, the similar scene also follows for Great World City.

In 2019, JYSK was replaced by Daiso (Now closed), replaced by Don Don Donki. Sushiro opened its first store in Southeast Asia at Tiong Bahru Plaza on 19 August 2019.

Frasers Property acquired AsiaMalls Management and its portfolio of five malls which includes Century Square, Hougang Mall, Tampines 1, White Sands, as well as office tower Central Plaza in 2020.

In March 2026, the lease for Golden Village cinema ended, and Xventure Park is slated to take over the space in November 2026.

== Gallery ==
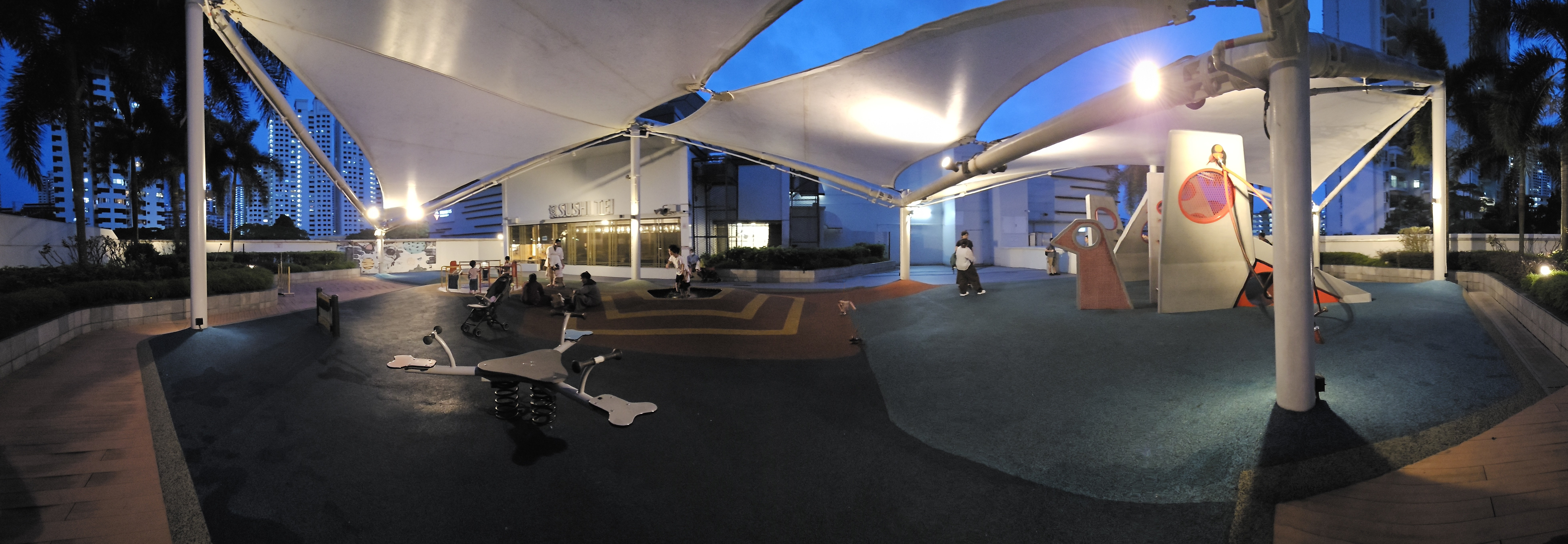
Open-air playground at Level 3 of Tiong Bahru Plaza
