= Tiong Bahru MRT station =

Mass Rapid Transit station in Singapore

Tiong Bahru EW17 中峇鲁 தியோங் பாரு
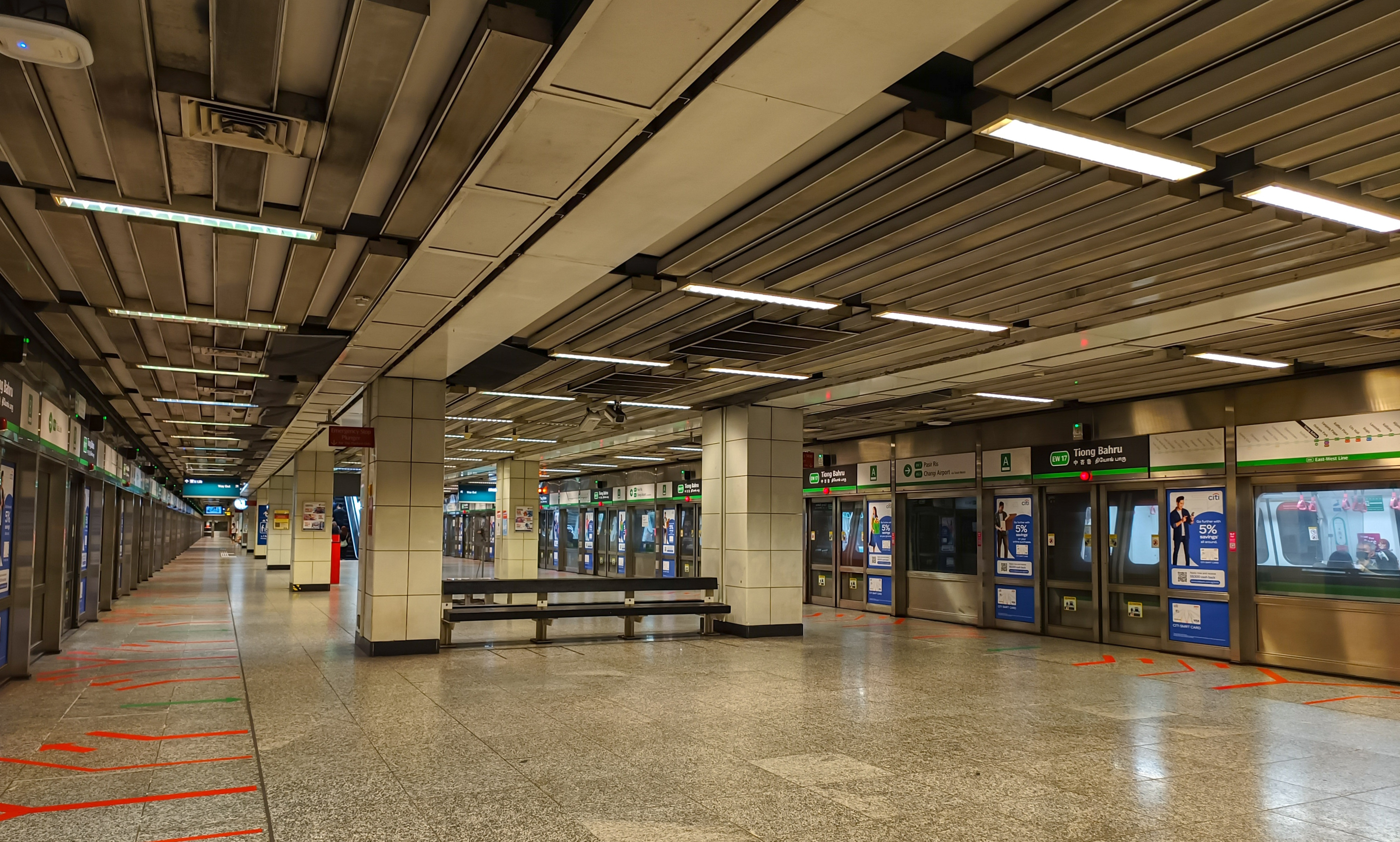
- Platform level of Tiong Bahru station

General information
- Location: 300 Tiong Bahru Road; Singapore 168731
- Coordinates: 1°17′9.89″N 103°49′37.05″E
- System: Mass Rapid Transit (MRT) station
- Operator: SMRT Trains Ltd (SMRT Corporation)
- Line: East–West Line
- Platforms: 2 (1 island platform)
- Tracks: 2
- Connections: Tiong Bahru Integrated Transport Hub (future) Bus, Taxi

Construction
- Structure type: Underground
- Platform levels: 1
- Parking: Yes (Tiong Bahru Plaza)
- Accessible: Yes

History
- Opened: 12 March 1988; 38 years ago

Passengers
- June 2024: 22,629 per day

Services
| Preceding station | Mass Rapid Transit | Following station |
|---|---|---|
| Outram Park towards Pasir Ris | East–West Line | Redhill towards Tuas Link |
Track layout
Location
- Location within Singapore Rail central area

Tiong Bahru MRT station is an underground Mass Rapid Transit (MRT) station on the East–West Line in Bukit Merah, Singapore. This is the first and last underground station for eastbound and westbound trains respectively.

Directly connected to Tiong Bahru Plaza, this station serves the residential precincts of Tiong Bahru and Bukit Ho Swee.

== History ==
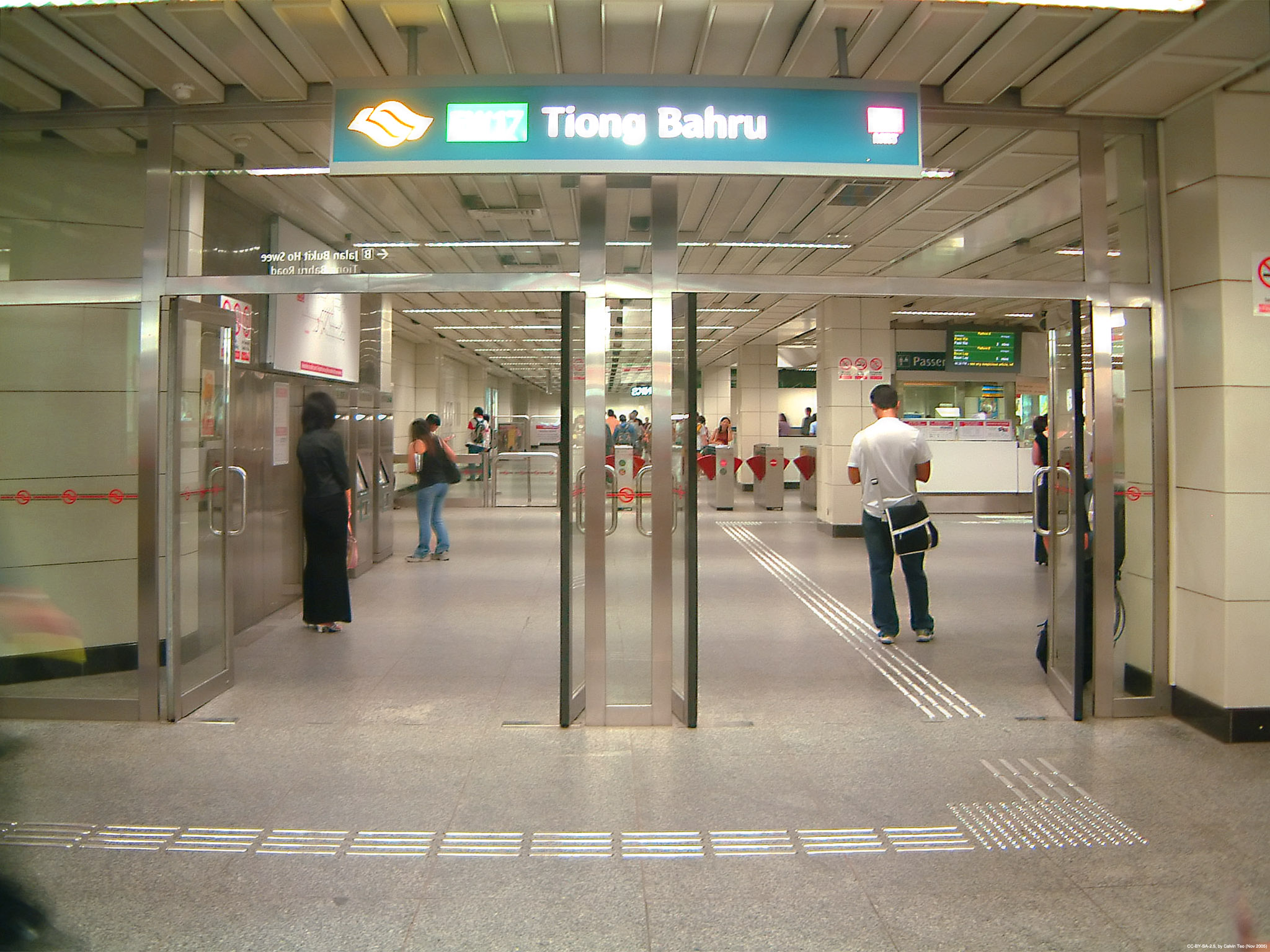
Concourse of Tiong Bahru MRT station.

On 5 April 1985, construction of Tiong Bahru MRT station and tunnels from Outram Park to Redhill was awarded to Ong Chwee Kou-Boris SAE joint venture under Contract 201.

Tiong Bahru station opened on 12 March 1988, which is part of the Phase 1B of the MRT line. It travels from Outram Park to Clementi.

To commemorate Total Defence Day in 2000, the Singapore Civil Defence Force conducted the first ever Shelter Open House at this station on 15 and 16 February, together with Somerset and Lavender.

Before the HarbourFront MRT station opened in 2003 on the North East Line, it was the nearest MRT station to Sentosa. Shuttle bus services linking Sentosa to Tiong Bahru MRT operated for several years until it was eventually withdrawn in 2004.

The station's upgrading, which included a new lift for the disabled, was completed on 29 December 2005.
