= Criminal Investigation Department (Singapore) =

Criminal Investigation Department in Singapore

- Abbreviation: CID

Jurisdictional structure
- National agency: Singapore
- Operations jurisdiction: Singapore
- Governing body: Government of Singapore
- General nature: Civilian police

Operational structure
- Overseen by: Ministry of Home Affairs
- Headquarters: Police Cantonment Complex
- Elected officers responsible: K. Shanmugam, Coordinating Minister for National Security & Minister for Home Affairs; Edwin Tong, 2nd Minister for Home Affairs; Muhammad Faishal Ibrahim, Senior Minister of State for Home Affairs; Sim Ann, Senior Minister of State for Home Affairs; Goh Pei Ming, Minister of State for Home Affairs
- Agency executives: SAC Julius Lim, Director Criminal Investigation Department
- Parent agency: Singapore Police Force
- Child agencies: Major Crime Division; Specialised Crime Division

The Criminal Investigation Department (CID) is one of the many departments under the Singapore Police Force for premier investigation and staff authority for criminal investigation matters within the Singapore Police Force.

The CID has a staff of over 500 officers, divided into Senior Investigation Officers, Investigation Officers, Police Officers and Civilian Officers. It is led by a director, who is assisted by 4 deputy directors.

== Overview ==
The CID conducts inquiries into a variety of criminal offences in Singapore, and is empowered to make arrests. Recent high-profile investigations include the Murder of Muhammad Noor in 2014. The present director is Senior Assistant Commissioner of Police Julius Lim. He took over this role from Deputy Commissioner of Police (DCP) Zhang Weihan, who was concurrently serving as Deputy Commissioner (Investigation and Intelligence).

== Structure ==
CID is led by a Director, currently SAC Julius Lim, and 4 Deputy Directors.

There are a total of 11 divisions in CID, with each division led by an assistant director, namely:

1. Operations, Management & Planning Division
  - Operations Management Branch
  - Prosecution Branch
  - Investigation Policy Branch
  - Investigations Operations Coordination Centre
  - Training Branch
  - Operations Planning Branch
2. Research, Planning & Organisational Development Division
3. Specialised Crime Division
  - Specialised Crime Branch
  - Specialised Crime Policy Branch
  - Casino Crime Investigation Branch
  - Intellectual Property Rights Branch
  - Secret Societies Branch
  - Unlicensed Moneylending Strikeforce
  - Organised Crime Branch
  - Financial Investigation Branch
4. Major Crime Division
  - Special Investigation Section
  - Serious Sexual Crime Branch
  - Operations and Policy Branch
5. Cybercrime Division
  - Cybercrime Investigation Branch
  - Cybercrime Policy and Operations Branch
  - Cyber Crime Strategy Office
6. Investigation Systems & Records Division
  - Criminal Records Office
  - Operations Planning Branch
7. Investigation Services & SupportDivision
  - Specialised Interview Branch
  - Corporate Services Branch
  - Manpower Branch
  - Service Quality Branch
8. Intelligence Division
9. Cyber Policy Division
10. Forensics Division
  - Forensics Management Branch
11. Digital Forensics Division
  - Digital Forensics Branch

== In popular culture ==
In 2006, a police procedural series, C.I.D. was produced by Mediacorp, starring Tay Ping Hui, Qi Yuwu, Apple Hong, Jeanette Aw, Ong Ai Leng, Brandon Wong and Zhang Yaodong.

This was followed with a collaboration between the CID and Mediacorp in 2010, 2011 and 2012, Unriddle C.L.I.F. and Unriddle 2, another police procedural series, in which the C.L.I.F. series lead to four sequels, C.L.I.F. 2, C.L.I.F. 3, C.L.I.F. 4 and C.L.I.F. 5.

== See also ==
- Crime in Singapore
