= Redhill MRT station =

Mass Rapid Transit station in Singapore

Redhill EW18 红山 ரெட்ஹில்
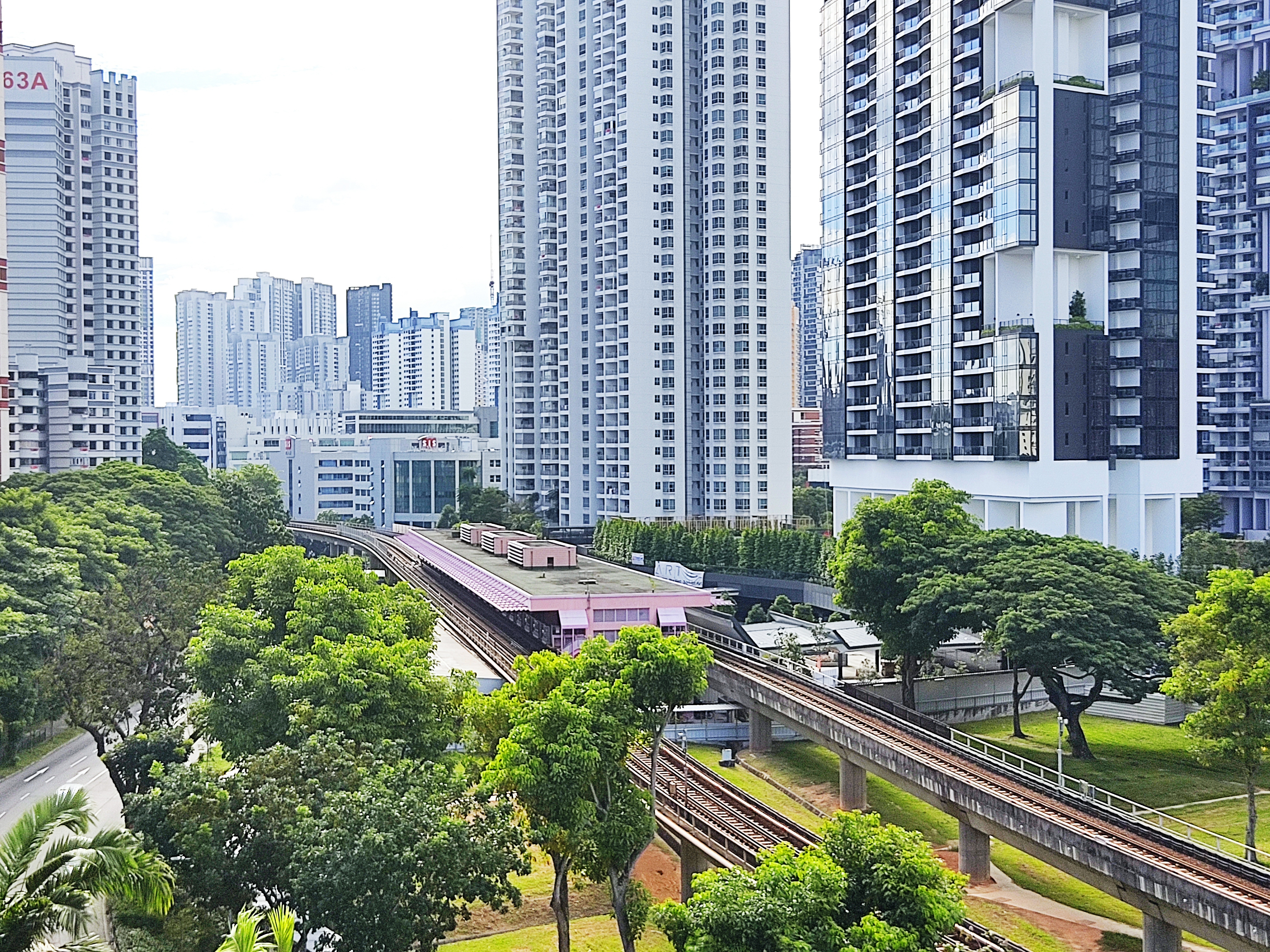
- Exterior of Redhill MRT station

General information
- Location: 920 Tiong Bahru Road; Singapore 158792
- Coordinates: 1°17′23″N 103°49′0″E
- System: Mass Rapid Transit (MRT) station
- Owner: Land Transport Authority (LTA)
- Operator: SMRT Trains
- Platforms: 2 (1 Island platform)
- Tracks: 2
- Connections: Bus, taxi

Construction
- Structure type: Elevated
- Cycle facilities: Yes
- Accessible: Yes (except for Exit B)
- Architect: BSK-BS Konsult

History
- Opened: 12 March 1988; 38 years ago
- Former names: Alexandra

Services
Preceding station	Mass Rapid Transit	Following station
Tiong Bahru towards Pasir Ris	East–West Line	Queenstown towards Tuas Link
Track layout
Location
- Location within Singapore Rail central area

Redhill MRT station is an above-ground Mass Rapid Transit (MRT) station in Singapore on the East–West Line (EWL). Operated by SMRT, the station serves nearby landmarks such as the Delta Swimming Complex and Thye Hong Centre.

First announced in May 1982 as Alexandra, it was renamed to Redhill in June 1983. The station commenced operations along with the entire MRT system on 12 March 1988 by Prime Minister Lee Kuan Yew. Bicycle facilities for the station were expanded in July 1990. Half-height platform screen doors and high-volume low-speed fans were installed by August 2011 and the first quarter of 2013, respectively. In March 2017, a linkway was installed between Redhill and the Enabling Village, a community space for disabled people to be integrated into society.

Like other elevated stations on the Tiong Bahru–Clementi stretch, the station feature grilles and horizontal louvres. Despite its name, Redhill features a pink colour scheme. Its roof also has clerestory windows.

== History ==
The Mass Rapid Transit (MRT) system was conceptualised in a 1971 study conducted by the Singapore Government and the United Nations Development Programme. The study – which assessed land-use transportation needs – concluded that Singapore would need a rail transit system by 1992. Further studies and debates on the feasibility of building a rapid transit system took place from 1972 to 1980, with Alexandra station appearing in initial plans by May 1982. Redhill was proposed to be part of the East–West Line, which was to have 22 stations and run from Jurong West to Bedok. On 30 May 1982, communications minister Ong Teng Cheong confirmed that the government approved construction of the MRT; Alexandra, along with other stations between Tiong Bahru and Clementi, were initially planned to be part of Phase II of the system. To increase the catchment of commuters, the provisional MRT authority moved that portion to be part of Phase IA, an extension of Phase I of the MRT, in June 1983. (Note: The EWL was initially planned to run between City Hall and Outram Park stations as part of Phase I of the MRT. Following the inclusion of Phase IA, Phase I of the EWL was planned to run from City Hall to Clementi stations.) Around this time, Alexandra station was renamed to Redhill station.

By September 1983, the Mass Rapid Transit Corporation (MRTC) was calling for the prequalification of consultants to design the civil and architectural works of Phase IA elevated stations – a month later, eleven local companies, nine of which were joint ventures between local companies and foreign businesses, were shortlisted for pre-qualification out of 38 applications. Ultimately, in January 1984, the MRTC appointed a five-member joint venture consisting of Mott, Hay and Anderson, Sir William Halcrow and Partners, BSK-BS Konsult, DP Architects, and the Public Works Department (PWD), to be the architectural and engineering consultants for Phase IA in a S$5.99 million (US$4.47 million) contract.

Nine single tenderers and joint ventures were prequalified for Contract 202 by October 1984, which detailed the construction of Redhill and Commonwealth stations as well as viaducts from Delta Swimming Complex to Queensway Circus. Ultimately, the MRTC awarded the contract to Sumitomo Construction in February 1985 for S$50 million (US$37.31 million) due to Sumitomo's experiences with major prestressed concrete bridge projects. Construction of Redhill and Commonwealth was expected to start in the same month and be completed by December 1987. By April and November 1987, the pink tiles for the station were already up, and operations were expected to start in April 1988, respectively. In February 1988, it was announced that Red Hill, along with Tiong Bahru station, will have an open house on 13 and 14 February, with expected operations moved to the middle of March. On 12 March 1988, Prime Minister Lee Kuan Yew officially launched the entire system, including stations in the Tiong Bahru-Clementi stretch. During the opening ceremony, Lee addressed to a crowd of 500 guests before riding a train to Queenstown.

In July 1990, it was announced that as part of the cycle-and-ride scheme, 10 stations, including Redhill, would have their bicycle stands extended. Following a rise in track intrusions as well as commuters slipping when rushing for the train, the LTA and SMRT decided to install platform screen doors, where it was expected for the works to be completed by 2012. After several tests at different stations, works for the half-height platform screen doors were expected to start in 2010, with eventual installation and operations commencing at Redhill station by August 2011. The station was installed with high-volume low-speed fans by the first quarter of 2013. In December 2017, works were completed for a 400 metres (440 yd) linkway from Redhill station to the Enabling Village, a community space for people with disabilities to be integrated in society, to make it more accessible for those with mobility issues. Prior to the linkway, the journey between the two places was a "challenge" for people with disabilities due to hills in the area. It was announced in March 2017 that as part a collaboration between the LTA and SG Enable, Redhill will serve as a test bed for "new mobility technologies and infrastructure" in order to improve accessibility for those with disabilities.

== Details ==
Redhill station is on the EWL with the station number of EW18, situated between Tiong Bahru and Queenstown stations. When it opened, it had the station number of W4 before being changed to its current station number in August 2001 as a part of a system-wide campaign to cater to the expanding MRT System. As a part of the EWL, the station is operated by SMRT Trains. Like many stations on the initial MRT network, Redhill has an island platform and is elevated. The station operates between 5:49 am and 12:08 am daily, with train frequencies varying from 2–5 minutes peak hour to an average of 5 minutes for off peak hours. The station is bounded by Tiong Bahru Road. It has two exits and serves surrounding amenities such as the Delta Swimming Complex, Thye Hong Centre, and Leng Kee Community Club. Redhill is mostly wheelchair-accessible and has bicycle facilities.

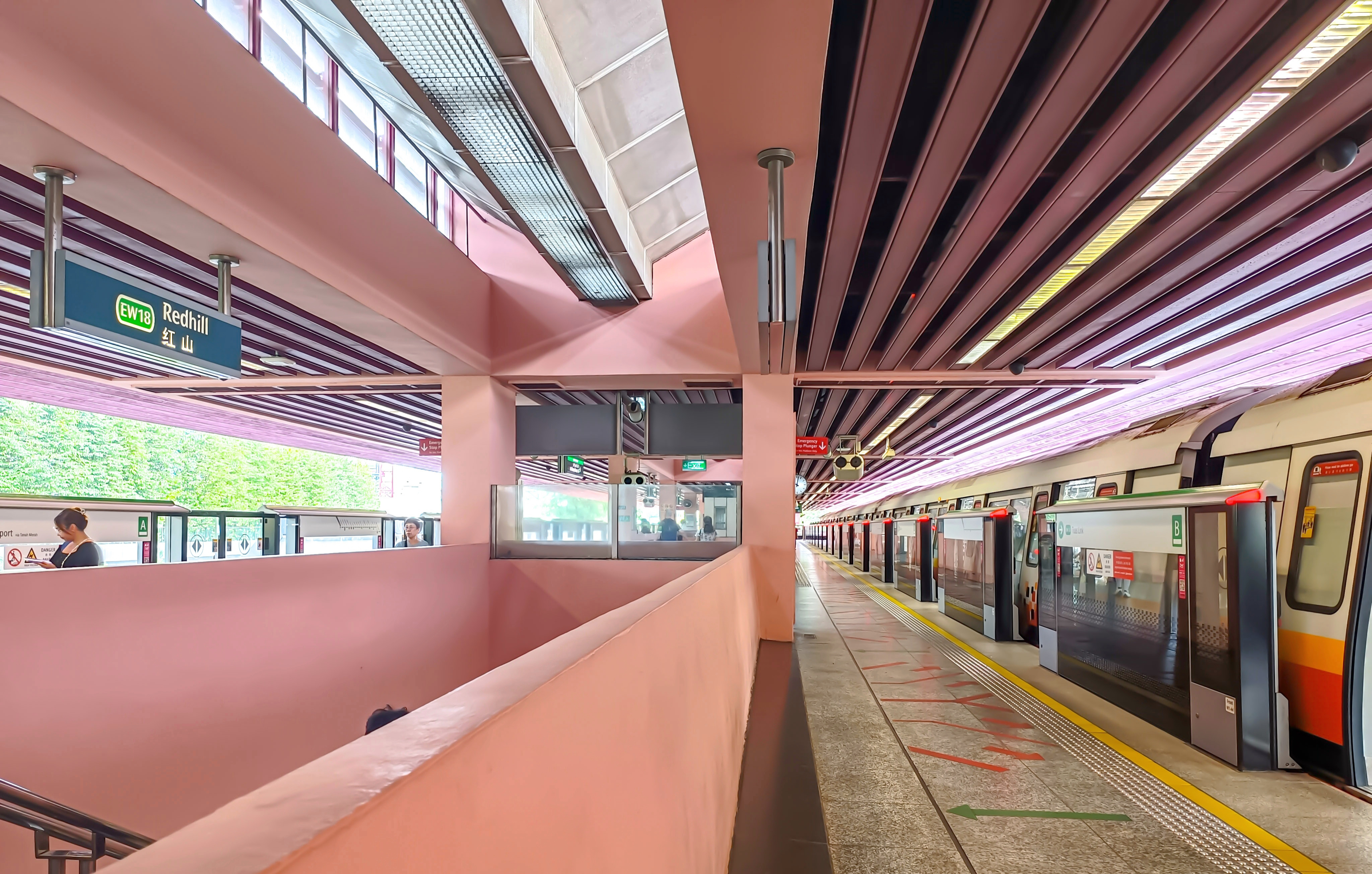
Redhill's pink walls and roof

Redhill station is a two-storey, elevated station. Its ground floor has the station's plant rooms, allowing for easy maintenance access. The upper floor, which is independent of the station's viaduct, has the station's communications and relay rooms, as well as the platforms – like many stations on the initial MRT network, Redhill's platforms were built in the island platform configuration. Like other stations in the Tiong Bahru-Clementi stretch of Phase IA, it was designed to have an identity similar to Singaporean traditions, according to BSK-BS Konsult's Michael Granit, who was in charge of the design philosophy for Phase IA.

Its horizontal louvres, what The Straits Times has described as "brashly coloured grilles which run right round the station, interrupted only by the regularly spaced columns", are equated to French windows in shophouses. Its platform columns can also be equated to the palladium columns in shophouses. Despite the station name being "Redhill", it features pink walls. (Note: The LTA however says that the colour palette used is red) This was done to make the station "be pleasant to the eye" and to distinguish it from other stations within the stretch. According to the MRTC, the pastel shade of the wall are reminiscent of traditional colours used for shophouses. Additionally, the roof for Redhill was an important design element as it would be able to be seen from high rise flats, with its roof featuring clerestory windows that makes the roof "look like huge lanterns" as well as being cantilevered to reduce rain shedding on platforms. It also has horizontal slats to reduce sun exposure to the trains and the apparent height of the upper roof line.
