= Police Cantonment Complex =

Office skyscraper in Singapore

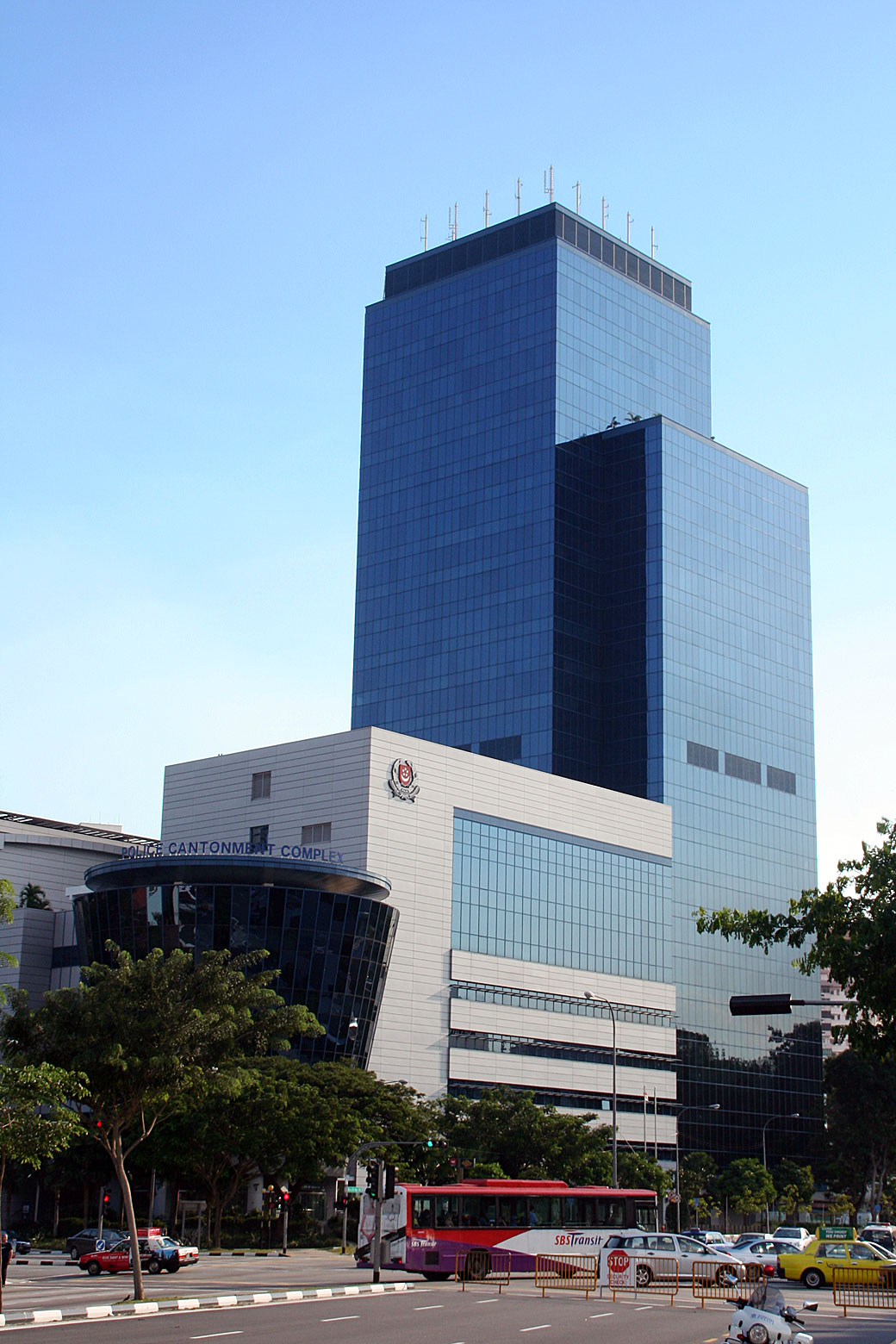

General information
- Status: Completed
- Type: Government
- Location: 391 New Bridge Road, Singapore 088762
- Coordinates: 1°16′42.29″N 103°50′21.57″E
- Construction started: November 1997; 28 years ago
- Completed: May 2001; 25 years ago
- Opening: July 2001; 25 years ago
- Cost: S$206.1 million
- Owner: Ministry of Home Affairs

Technical details
- Floor count: 25
- Floor area: 106,400 m^{2}

Design and construction
- Architect: Public Works Department
- Structural engineer: CPG Corporation
- Main contractor: Kajima Overseas Asia Pte Ltd

The Police Cantonment Complex (PCC) is a high-rise government complex located on 391 New Bridge Road, Singapore 088762, next to Outram Park MRT station. It was officially opened in July 2001.

== Amenities and architecture ==
The design of the building integrates the varied operational requirements of the major offices to create a modern and efficient environmental look for the complex. Each department block uses its own different shape and size to serve a different purpose.

The semi-circular structure at the corner depicts a soaring bird's wing.

The energy-efficient aluminium and glass curtain-wall, intelligent building management system, document conveying system and central vacuum system are some of the unique features of the main complex.

The complex consists of four blocks of building and consists of a 25-storey tower with 6 to 9-storey podium blocks and a 4-storey basement for parking, services and operational areas. Block A houses the Central Police Division, together with the Bukit Merah East Neighbourhood Police Centre. Block B houses the Central Narcotics Bureau (CNB), while the Criminal Investigation Department (CID) is located in Block C and the Commercial Affairs Department (CAD) in Block D. Located on the second floor of Block D are the Certificate of No Criminal Conviction (CNCC) Office, Record Office, Police Welfare Division and Licensing Division.

A new Block E as an extension will be ready in 2027. It has 26 stories as seen from the outside

The complex is guarded with armed Aetos Auxiliary police officers and vehicle access roads have road blocker barriers to protect the building.
