= Maritime Square (subzone) =

- Subzone of Bukit Merah Planning Area

Other transcription(s)
  - Chinese: 海事广场
- Interactive map of Maritime Square
- Country: Singapore
- Region: Central Region
- Planning Area: Bukit Merah

Maritime Square (Chinese: 海事广场) is a subzone within the planning area of Bukit Merah, Singapore, as defined by the Urban Redevelopment Authority (URA). Its boundary is made up of Henderson Road, Telok Blangah Way and Telok Blangah Rise in the north; Lower Delta Road, Kampong Bahru Road and Sentosa Gateway in the east; the Keppel Harbour in the south; West Coast Highway and Labrador Villa Road in the west.

The area commonly known as HarbourFront is situated at the southern portion of this subzone. Pulau Keppel is also included as part of the territory of Maritime Square.
