= BreadTalk =

Singapore food corporation

BreadTalk Group Pte Ltd

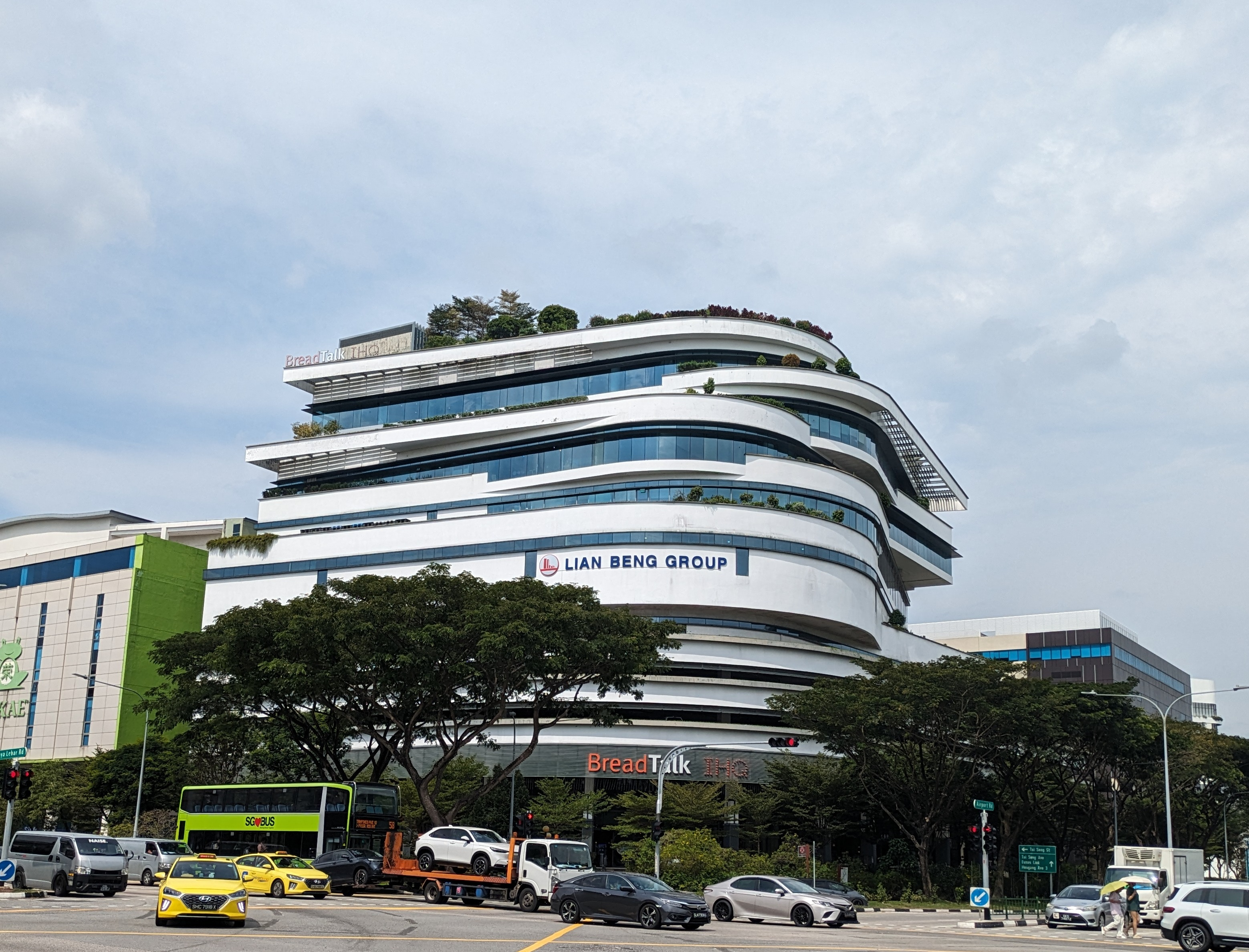
- The international headquarters of BreadTalk
- Type: Privately held company
- Industry: Food and beverage
- Founded: 2000; 26 years ago
- Headquarters: Singapore
- Number of locations: >1,000 stores (4Q2019)
- Key people: Dr George Quek Meng Tong (Co-Founder, Chairman, Group CEO); Katherine Lee Lih Leng (Co-Founder, Deputy Chairman)
- Revenue: ▲SG$170.4 million (4Q2019)
- Number of employees: 7,000
- Divisions: 4
- Website: www.breadtalk.com

BreadTalk Group Private Limited is a Singaporean multinational snack and beverage corporation headquartered in Paya Lebar, Singapore.

== History ==
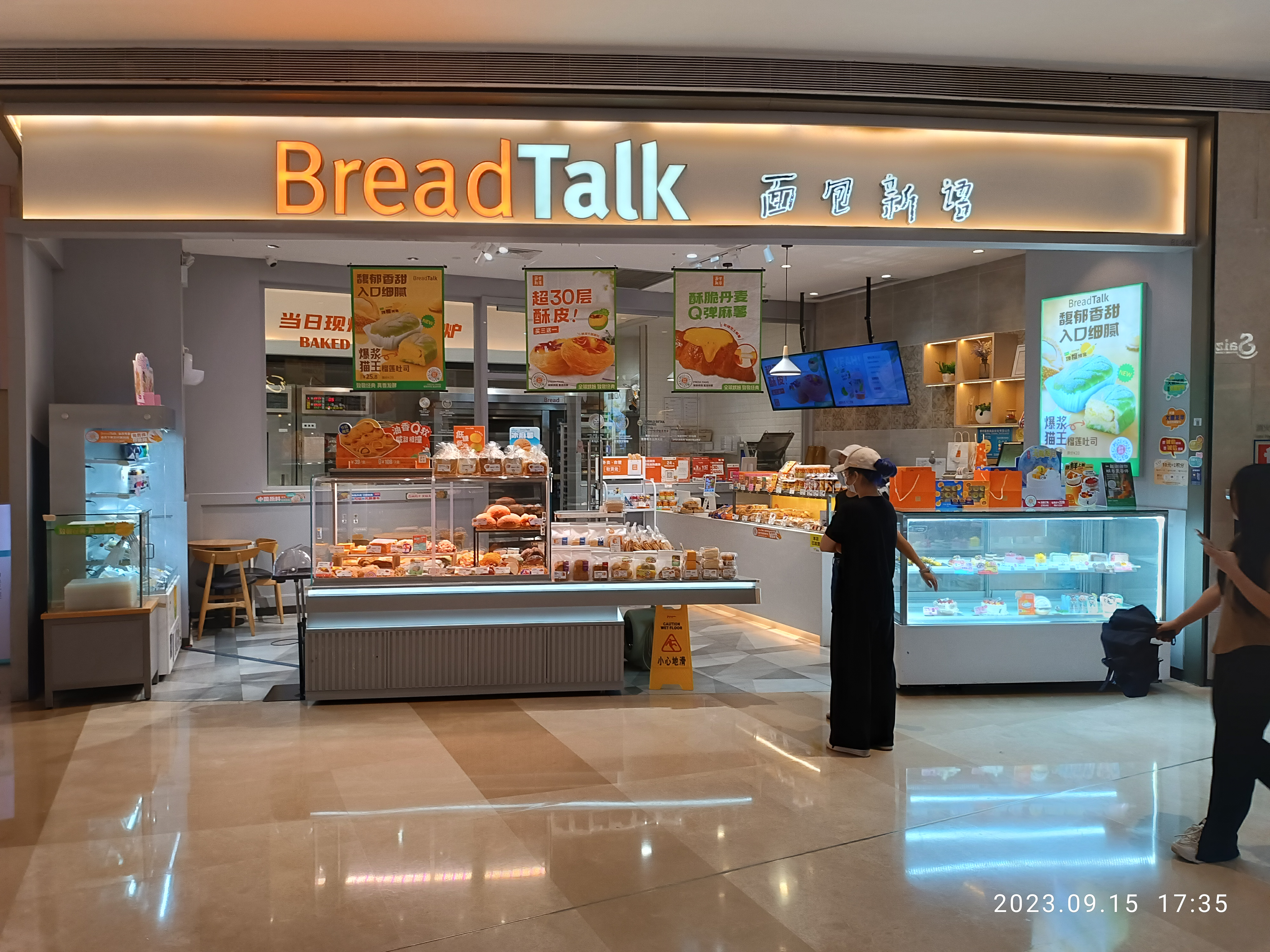
A BreadTalk branch in Shenzhen, China

BreadTalk Group Pte. Ltd. was founded as a bakery brand by George Quek in Singapore and opened its first outlet at Bugis Junction in July 2000. It was listed on the Singapore Exchange in 2003.

In 2003, BreadTalk opened its first outlet in China.

In October 2005, BreadTalk launched its first food court, Food Republic, at Wisma Atria.

In August 2011, BreadTalk started construction of a new building, BreadTalk IHQ Building, at Paya Lebar iPark along Tai Seng Street. BreadTalk IHQ Building was constructed to house BreadTalk international headquarters and cost $64.08 million. The building is 10-storey high and shaped like a Danish pastry designed by architect Tan Kay Ngee.

In June 2013, Phase 1 of BreadTalk's building was completed with the first floor, consisting of Din Tai Fung, RamenPlay, BreadTalk, Toast Box and Food Republic, opened to public. Phase 2 of the building, the second floor, to be opened a month later in July, housing retail outlets.

In December 2018, the Group opened its first Din Tai Fung restaurant in London. BreadTalk also partnered with Bakekneads, a part of the Som Datt Group, as the master franchise for India's national capital region.

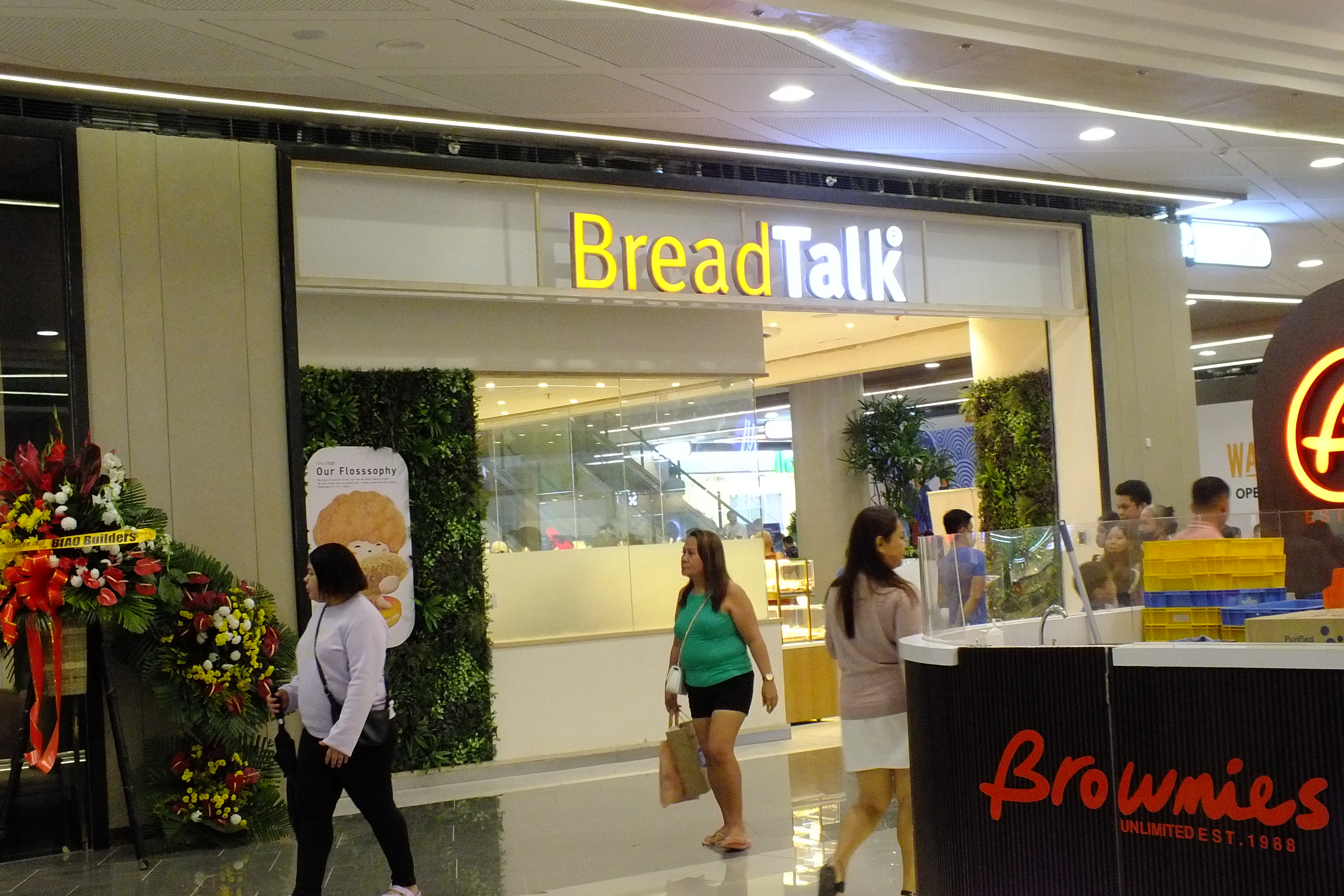
BreadTalk at SM J Mall located in Mandaue City.

On 20 February 2019, BreadTalk Group bought out its Thai joint venture partner's 50% stake, The Minor Food Group, for S$6.96 million.

BreadTalk Group announced on 2 September 2019 that it planned to buy Food Junction, a food court operator, for $80 million. The Competition and Consumer Commission of Singapore allowed the acquisition on 15 October 2019 as the acquisition would not substantially reduce competition, and would also allow BreadTalk to better compete with other food operators.

In 2020, BreadTalk announced a net loss of $5.2 million for 2019 while it had a net profit of $15.2 million for 2018. It also announced a cash offer to acquire all issued ordinary shares in BreadTalk by BTG Holding which is owned by Quek, his wife Katherine Lee and Thailand-based hospitality company Minor International. On 5 June, the company was delisted from the Singapore Exchange.

BreadTalk also signed a deal with First Street Teochew Fish Soup to open a new stall at BreadTalk HQ and future stalls at its Food Republic food courts.

In 2021, a consortium led by Lian Beng Group made a S$118 million sale-and-leaseback deal with BreadTalk to buy the BreadTalk IHQ Building and leased back to Breadtalk as an anchor tenant for 10 years. Breadtalk has the option to extend its lease for another five years or buy back the building.

It has since expanded to more than 900 retail stores spread across 15 markets. Its brand portfolio consists of BreadTalk, Toast Box, Food Republic, Food Junction, Bread Society, Thye Moh Chan, The Icing Room, Sō Ramen, Butter Bean and Charlie Tea in Singapore. Din Tai Fung, Song Fa Bak Kut Teh and Wu Pao Chun are franchised brands.

The Group has a network of owned bakery outlets in Singapore, PRC, Malaysia, Hong Kong and Thailand as well as franchised bakery outlets across Asia, Europe and the Middle East. It also owns and operates the Din Tai Fung restaurants in Singapore, Thailand and the United Kingdom, as well as the Food Republic food atria in Singapore, China, Taiwan, Hong Kong and Malaysia.

Milestones
Year	Event
2004	Brought in Din Tai Fung
2008	Opened inaugural BreadTalk stores in Oman
2009	Launched 1st Bread Society outlet, an artisanal bakery in ION Orchard
2011	Ground Breaking ceremony for the IHQ Building
2012	Global launch of concept BreadTalk outlet in Shanghai
2015	Launched a new global concept BreadTalk outlet in VivoCity
2016	BreadTalk Group inked joint venture to enter the United Kingdom with Din Tai Fung restaurants
2016	BreadTalk inked an agreement to enter Myanmar market
2016	Food Republic, Toast Box and BreadTalk opened outlets iAT Shanghai Disneyland
2017	BreadTalk opens the first Myanmar outlet at Junction City Mall in Yangon
2017	Toast Box opens the first outlet at Terminal 3 of Soekarno-Hatta International Airport, Jakarta
2018	BreadTalk Group inked a joint venture with Song Fa Bak Kut Teh to expand into new markets such as China and Thailand. Its first outlet opened in Shanghai
2018	BreadTalk Group enters a joint venture with Wu Pao Chun Bakery for expansion into four major cities in China.
2018	BreadTalk Group partners with Shenzhen Pindao to bring popular tea beverage brands Nayuki and Tai Gai to Singapore and Thailand.
2018	Food Republic opens its first Direct Operated Restaurant ‘Sergeant Kitchen’ in Bangkok in March 2018.
2019	BreadTalk Group opens the first Wu Pao Chun store in South East Asia
2020	BreadTalk Group opens its first Butter Bean outlet at Funan mall
2020	BreadTalk Group opens its first Charlie Tea outlet at Takashimaya Shopping Centre, Ngee Ann City

== Awards ==
- SPBA Most Promising Brand Award 2002
- Design for Asia Award, Hong Kong Design Centre 2004
- Five Star Diamond Brand, World Brand Laboratory in Shanghai, PRC
- World Branding Awards 2017

== Other Brands ==
=== Food Republic ===
BreadTalk Group's Food Republic foodcourts in Singapore are situated in shopping malls such as Wisma Atria, Vivocity and Suntec City. Overseas, there are food courts in Hong Kong (also in Silvercord of Canton Road, Tsim Sha Tsui), the People's Republic of China, Malaysia, Taiwan and Thailand.

=== Food Junction ===
BreadTalk Group acquired Food Junction in 2019.

=== Toast Box ===
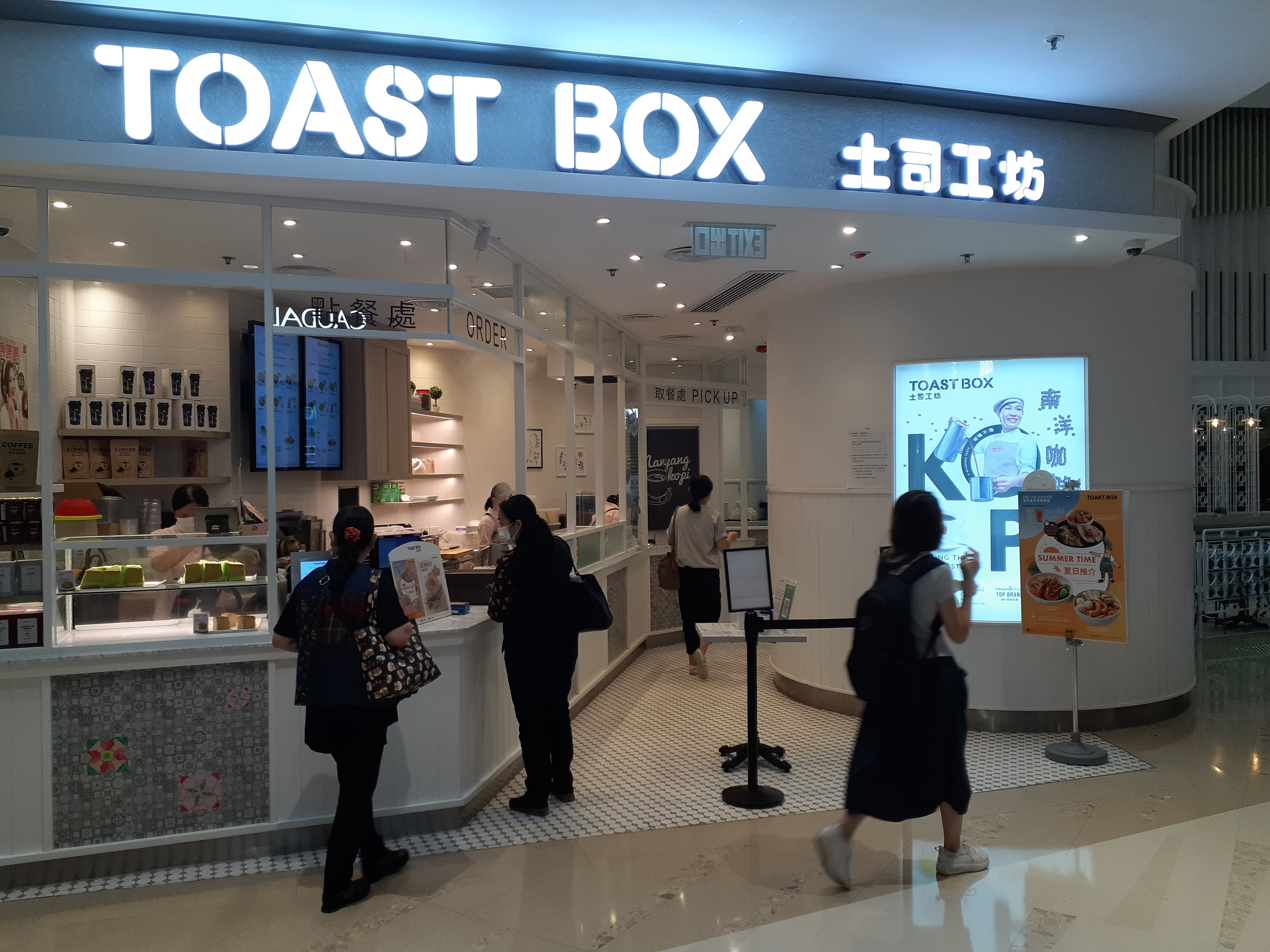
A ToastBox outlet

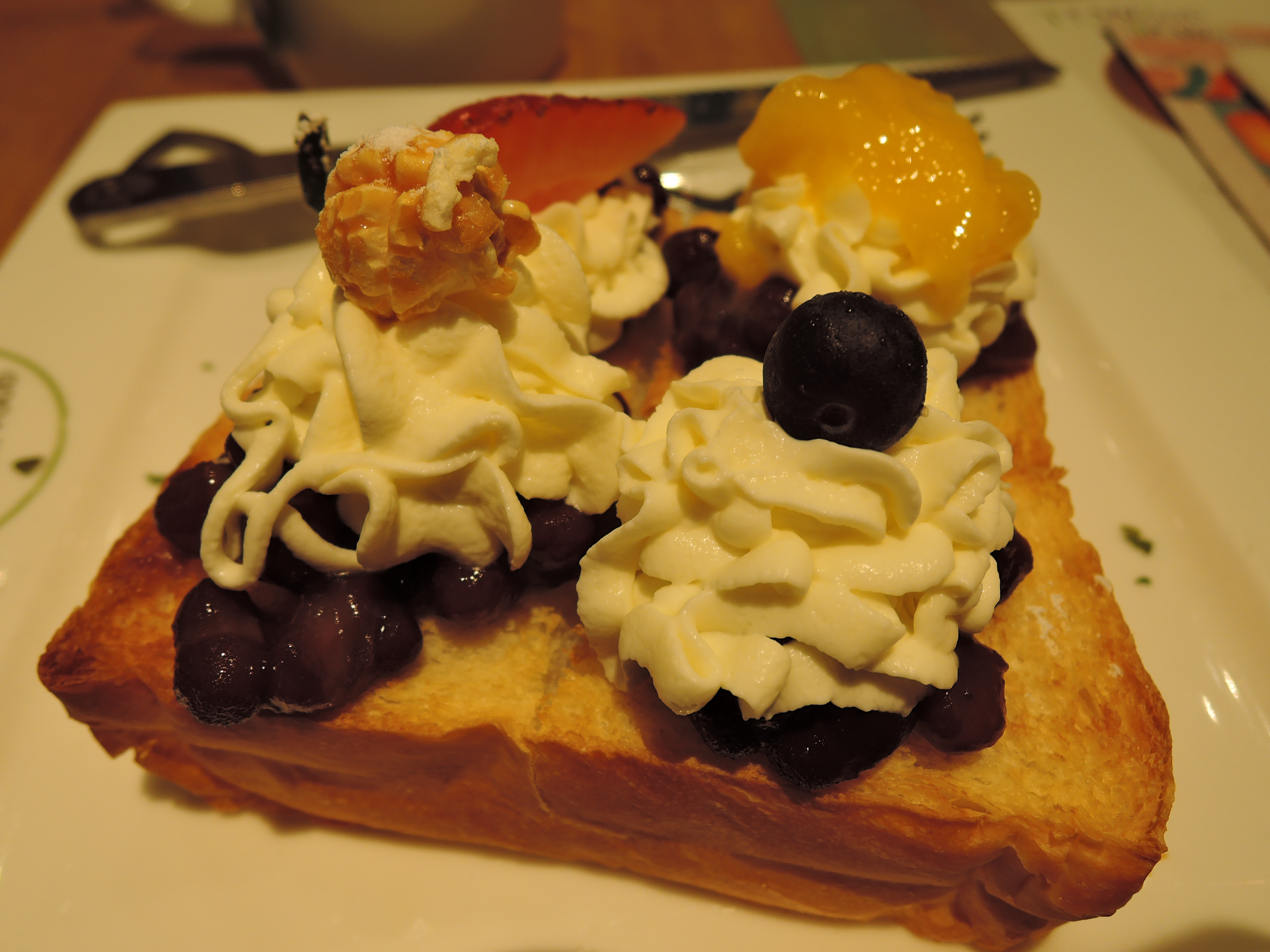
ToastBox dessert

BreadTalk Group operates the Toast Box concept, serving mainly coffee and kaya toast among other traditional and modern snacks. These Toast Box outlets are typically attached to the main BreadTalk outlet or in a Food Republic food court. There have been stand-alone stores in recent years.

=== Din Tai Fung ===
BreadTalk Group is the franchisee of Taiwanese Xiao Long Bao restaurant, Din Tai Fung. It opened its first restaurant in the upscale Paragon shopping mall and has opened other outlets in the island, including one in Bishan and another in the basement annex of Raffles City. Din Tai Fung has 8 branches in Thailand. It was announced that BreadTalk Group has also been awarded the franchise to operate Din Tai Fung in the United Kingdom. This was the result of successful partnerships and the positive reputation that BreadTalk Group has had in managing the franchise in Singapore and Thailand.

=== The Icing Room ===
The Icing Room is the first-ever "Design-It-Yourself" cakes and pastry shop.

=== Thye Moh Chan ===
This 70-year old Teochew bakery was acquired in 2013.

=== Wu Pao Chun ===
BreadTalk Group opened the first Wu Pao Chun store in South East Asia in May 2019.

=== Bread Society ===
Bread Society embraces traditional artisanal baking techniques using highly nutritious ingredients.

=== Sanpoutei ===
BreadTalk Group continued to partner with the Sanpou Group to expand its variety of ramen shops in Singapore. Since 2014, Sanpoutei, which specialises in Niigata-style shoyu ramen has been operating in Holland Village. Another outlet in Shaw Centre was subsequently added, in line with the successful product reception in Singapore.

=== Sō Ramen ===
Sō Ramen, originally known as Ramenplay, is a ramen restaurant. It also offers Koshihikari rice grown from Niigata.

=== Butter Bean ===
Butter Bean is a home-grown brand by BreadTalk Group operating as a hip café concept. It offers contemporary twists to traditional Singaporean dishes.

=== Charlie Tea ===
Charlie Tea is a home-grown brand by BreadTalk Group specialising in a variety of tea beverages, including bubble tea, and baked goods.

== Incidents ==
=== Perceived profiteering ===
On 25 March 2015, BreadTalk pulled buns commemorating Lee Kuan Yew off shelves after receiving flak from the public. Although the proceeds from sale of the buns were meant for charitable purposes, poor communication of intentions led to the misunderstanding. BreadTalk apologised publicly on its Facebook page.

=== False claim of freshly prepared ===
On 4 August 2015, BreadTalk stopped selling soya milk previously labelled "freshly prepared" as they confirmed (after being confronted with photographic evidence) that the product was repackaged Yeo's soya milk packet drink. Prior to investigations, the company had initially denied that they were misleading customers. After the details had gone viral online, Breadtalk eventually apologised for its actions. On 6 August 2015, the Consumers Association of Singapore warned Breadtalk they would pursue action if the practice continued.

=== Expired ingredients ===
BreadTalk's China franchise was also accused of selling food with expired ingredients, although such a claim has yet to be proven. Seemingly contaminated wheatmeal and butter two years past its expiry date were among discoveries claimed by an undercover reporter at Hangzhou Guangqi Trade Co, in the eastern city of Hangzhou.

=== Illegal waste discharge ===
On 10 June 2019, the Public Utilities Board (PUB) disclosed that BreadTalk was fined S$16,300 for repeated offences of illegal waste discharge into sewers, making it among 38 companies fined for similar offences. Prior to this, BreadTalk was charged with a fine of S$19,000 for six other incidents of illegal waste discharge.

== See also ==
- List of food companies
