= Harbourfront =

Harbourfront may refer to the following places:

- Harbourfront, Toronto, Canada
  - Harbourfront Centre
- HarbourFront (Singapore)
  - HarbourFront Centre
  - HarbourFront MRT station
- Central Harbourfront, Hong Kong
