= String theory (disambiguation) =

String theory is a branch of theoretical physics.

String theory may also refer to:

- Concatenation theory, a topic in symbolic logic dealing with strings of characters

Music

- String Theory (band), an American electronic music band
- String Theory (Hanson album), 2018
- String Theory (The Selecter album), 2013

Other media

- "String Theory" (Heroes), retitled "Five Years Gone", an episode of the TV series Heroes
- "String Theory" (The Shield), an episode of the TV series The Shield
- String Theory (novels), a trilogy of Star Trek: Voyager novels
- String Theory, a webcomic graphic novel based on the TV series Heroes
- String Theory (artist collective), based in Gothenburg, Sweden, and Berlin, Germany

== See also ==
- String theory landscape, the large number of possible false vacua in string theory
- Knot theory, a branch of mathematical topology
