= Keppel Island (disambiguation) =

Keppel Island can mean:

- Keppel Island, the constituent island that is a part of the larger archipelago of the Falkland Islands
- the Keppel Islands of Australia, including Great Keppel Island
- Keppel Bay Islands National Park
- Keppel Island, Singapore, an island located in Singapore
- Niuatoputapu, an island in Tonga, formerly known as Keppel Island
