= Keppel Bay Bridge =

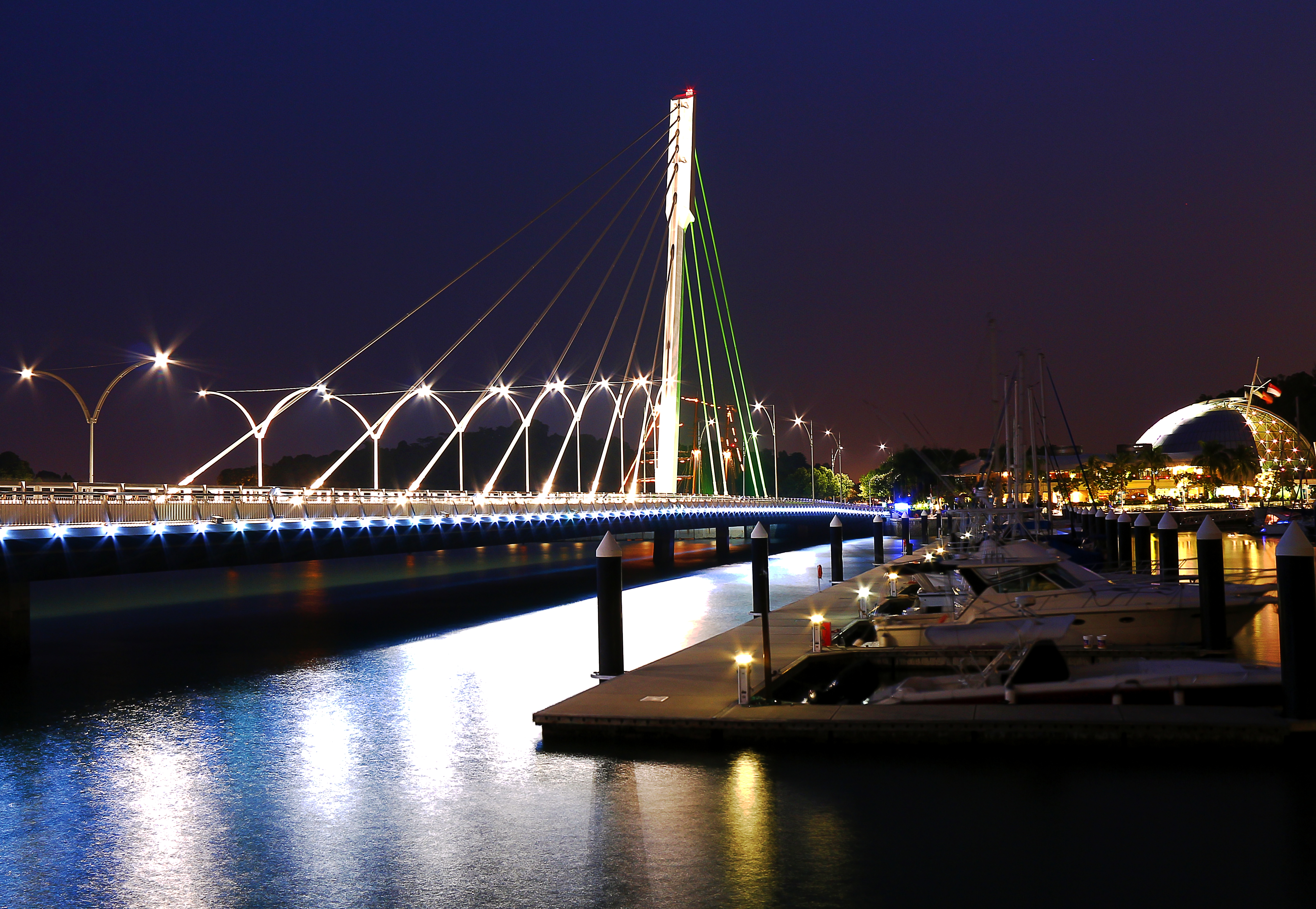
- Photographed in September 2012
- Coordinates: 1°15′50″N 103°48′50″E
- Carries: Motor vehicles and pedestrians
- Crosses: Keppel Bay
- Locale: HarbourFront, Bukit Merah, Singapore
- Official name: Keppel Bay Bridge
- Maintained by: Land Transport Authority

Characteristics
- Design: Cable stayed bridge
- Total length: 250 metres (820 ft)

History
- Designer: DCA Architects Pte Ltd and TY Lin International Pte Ltd [2]
- Constructed by: Penta Ocean Construction Co. Ltd. [2]
- Opened: 3 January 2008; 17 years ago

The Keppel Bay Bridge (Chinese: 吉宝湾桥, Malay: Jambatan Teluk Keppel) is the longest cable-stayed bridge in Singapore along Keppel Bay Vista, spanning 250 metres across the strait linking the private Keppel Island to mainland. The bridge was officially opened on 3 January 2008 by the sixth President of Singapore S. R. Nathan.

Built at a cost of $30 million, the cable-stayed bridge allows currents to flow freely through the marina basin, bringing in nutrients, plankton and marine larvae, while helping to remove sediment that would otherwise settle on marine organisms and smother them.
