= Library@harbourfront =

Public library in Singapore

Coordinates: 1°15′50″N 103°49′20″E

library@harbourfront
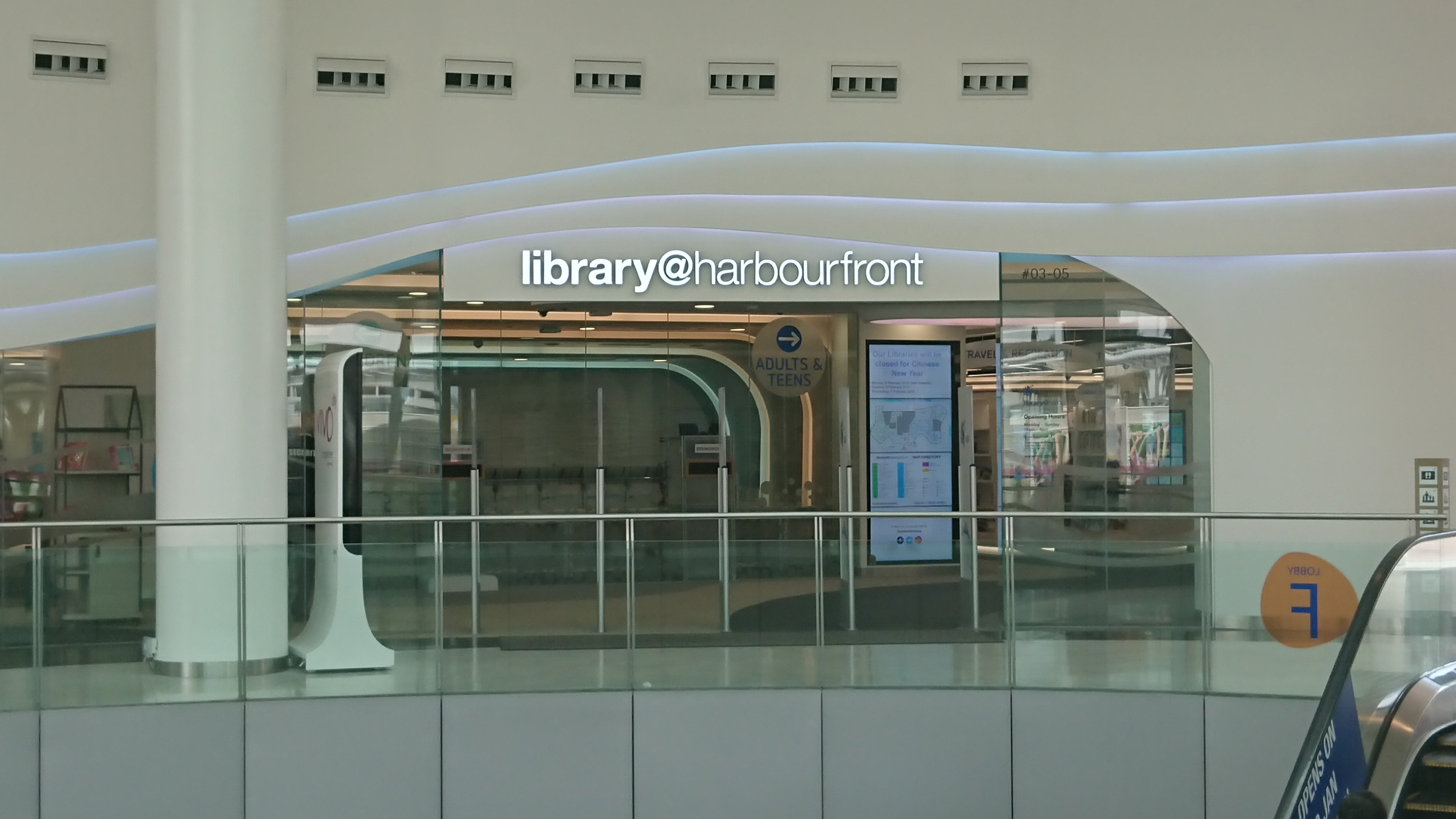
- Location: 1 HarbourFront Walk, #03-05, VivoCity, Singapore 098585, Singapore
- Type: Public library
- Established: 28 December 1982; 43 years ago (as Bukit Merah Public Library); 12 January 2019; 7 years ago (as library@harbourfront)
- Dissolved: 1 December 2018; 7 years ago (as Bukit Merah Public Library)
- Branch of: National Library Board

Collection
- Size: 245,465

Access and use
- Population served: 220,000

Other information
- Public transit access: NE1 CC29 HarbourFront, Sentosa Express, HarbourFront Bus Interchange
- Website: Official Website

library@harbourfront, formerly known as Bukit Merah Public Library, is a public library located at VivoCity, Singapore. It is the largest shopping mall public library in Singapore.

== History ==
Originally called Bukit Merah Branch Library, it serves the residents of Tanjong Pagar, Bukit Merah, Tiong Bahru and Telok Blangah. The library, which was situated at 3779 Jalan Bukit Merah, Singapore 159462, was officially opened on 28 December 1982 by the then Minister-without-Portfolio and Member of Parliament for Bukit Merah Lim Chee Onn. On 29 December 1982, the library was open to public. It is the first branch library to have an audiovisual (AV) section.

The library closed for renovation from 28 December 2004 to 25 February 2005. It was officially reopened by the then Parliamentary Secretary, MINDEF and Ministry of Environment and Water Resources, MP for Tanjong Pagar GRC and Associate Professor Koo Tsai Kee on that same day.

On 1 December 2018, the library ceased operations and was subsequently relocated to VivoCity as announced in 2017. At its current location the nearest MRT station to it is HarbourFront.

=== Planning ===
Bukit Merah Branch Library was originally planned in 1972, with the intention of being located at Telok Blangah New Town Centre, however, due to issues in securing the land the project was postponed. A new site for the library was found in February 1975. It was to have 4 storeys, however, this was reduced to 3.

=== Renaming ===
The library was renamed as Bukit Merah Community Library when National Library became a statutory board on 1 September 1995.

The library was renamed as Bukit Merah Public Library after its renovation.

On 12 January 2019, library@harbourfront was officially opened by the Minister for Communications and Information and Minister-in-Charge of Cyber Security, MP for West Coast GRC S. Iswaran.

== Layout ==
Located on the 3rd floor of VivoCity, the library is designed with two distinct zones appealing to adults, teens and children. The children's section is designed to help young readers to learn through technology. The adults and teens section will be run by volunteers who will help to find and shelve books. In place of physical newspapers, there are 16 e-newspaper reading stations, the most of its kind in Singapore.

== See also ==
- National Library Board
- List of libraries in Singapore
