= VivoCity =

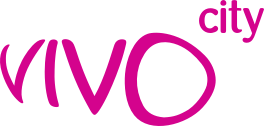

- Main facade of VivoCity
- Location: 1 HarbourFront Walk, Singapore 098585
- Coordinates: 1°15′50″N 103°49′20″E
- Opened: 7 October 2006; 20 years ago (Soft opening); 1 December 2006; 19 years ago (Official opening)
- Developer: Mapletree Investments Pte Ltd
- Manager: Mapletree Commercial Property Management Pte Ltd
- Owner: DBS Trustee Limited as Trustee of Mapletree Commercial Trust
- Architect: Toyo Ito
- Num. of stores: 340
- Num. of anchor tenants: 8 FairPrice Xtra; Best Denki library@harbourfront Tangs; Uniqlo; Zara; Golden Village; Toys R Us
- Floor area: 99,987 m^{2} (1,076,250 sq ft) (Net lettable area); 142,854 m^{2} (1,537,670 sq ft) (Gross floor area)
- Floors: 5
- Public transit: NE1 CC29 HarbourFront; VivoCity station (Sentosa Express); HarbourFront
- Website: vivocity.com.sg

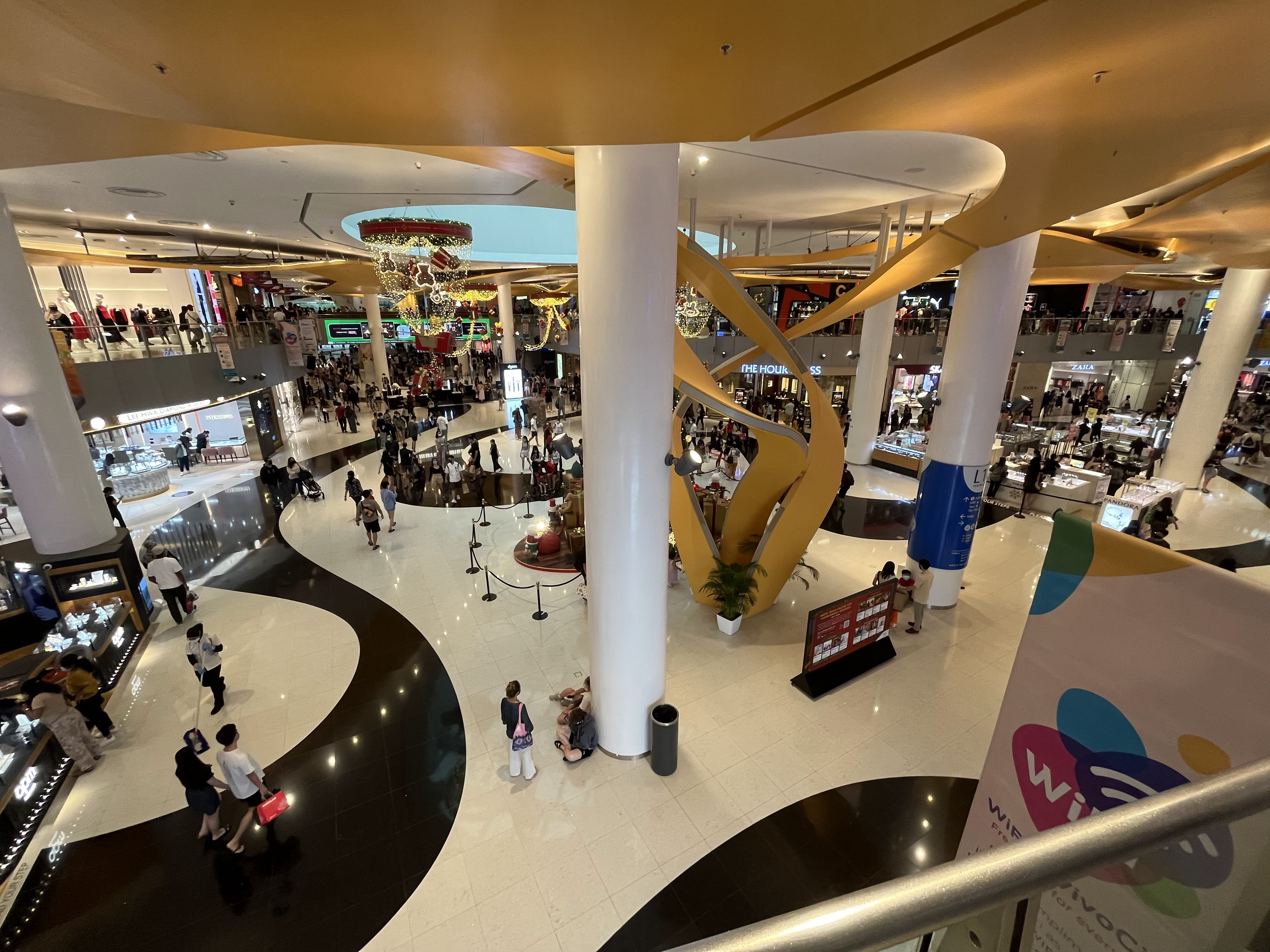
Main atrium of VivoCity in December 2021

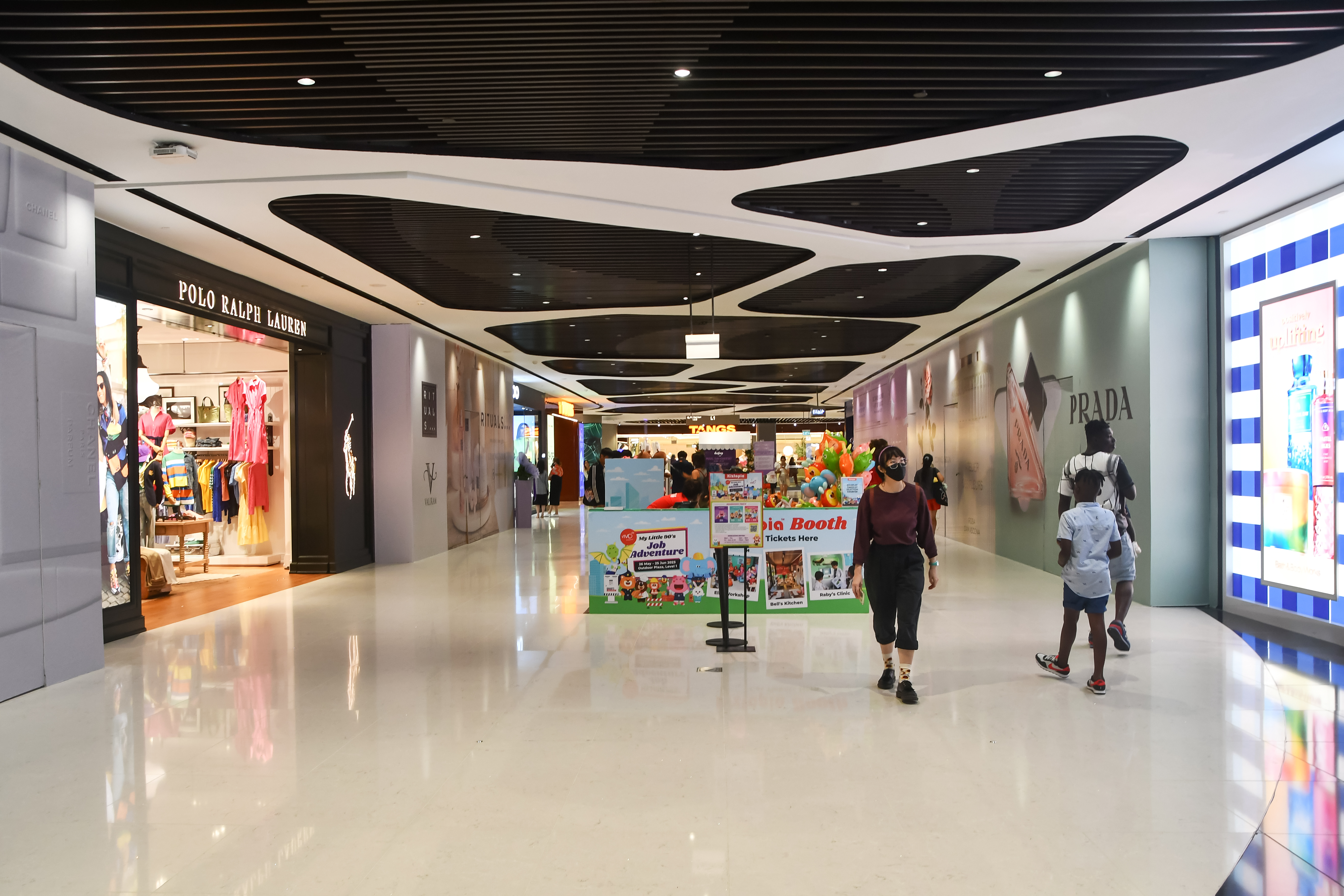
VivoCity's Interior in June 2023

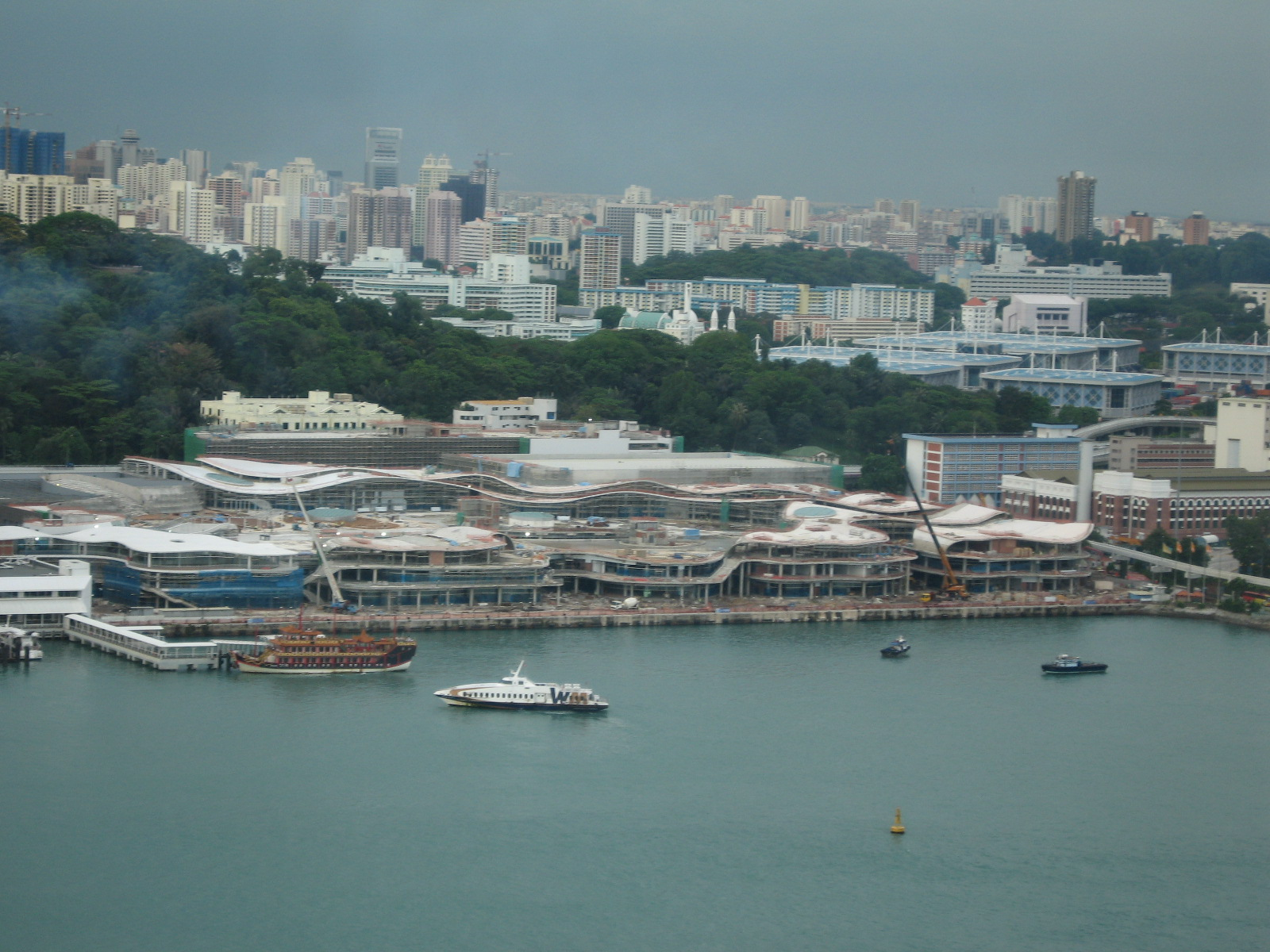
VivoCity under construction (April 2006)

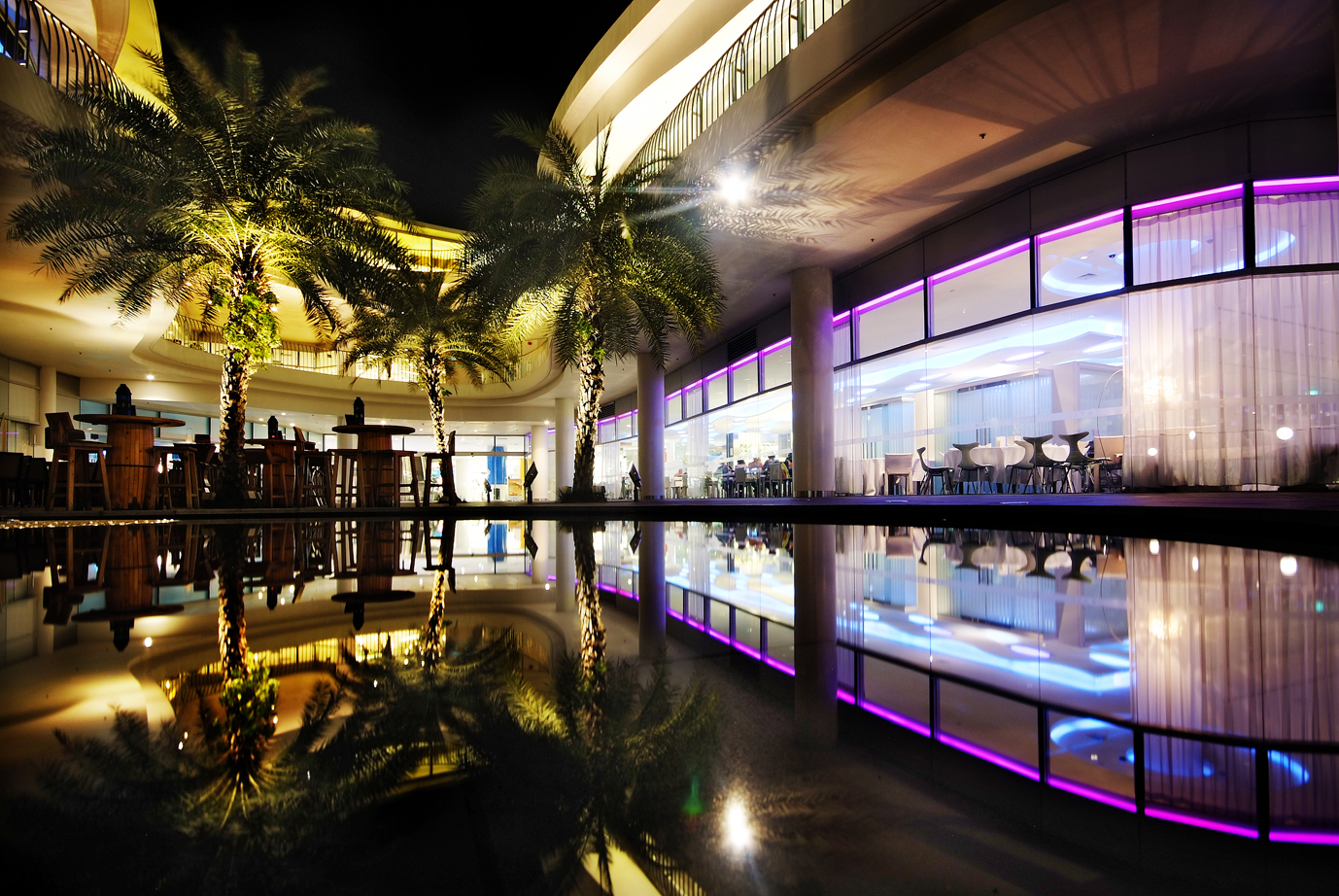
Exterior of VivoCity at night (2009)

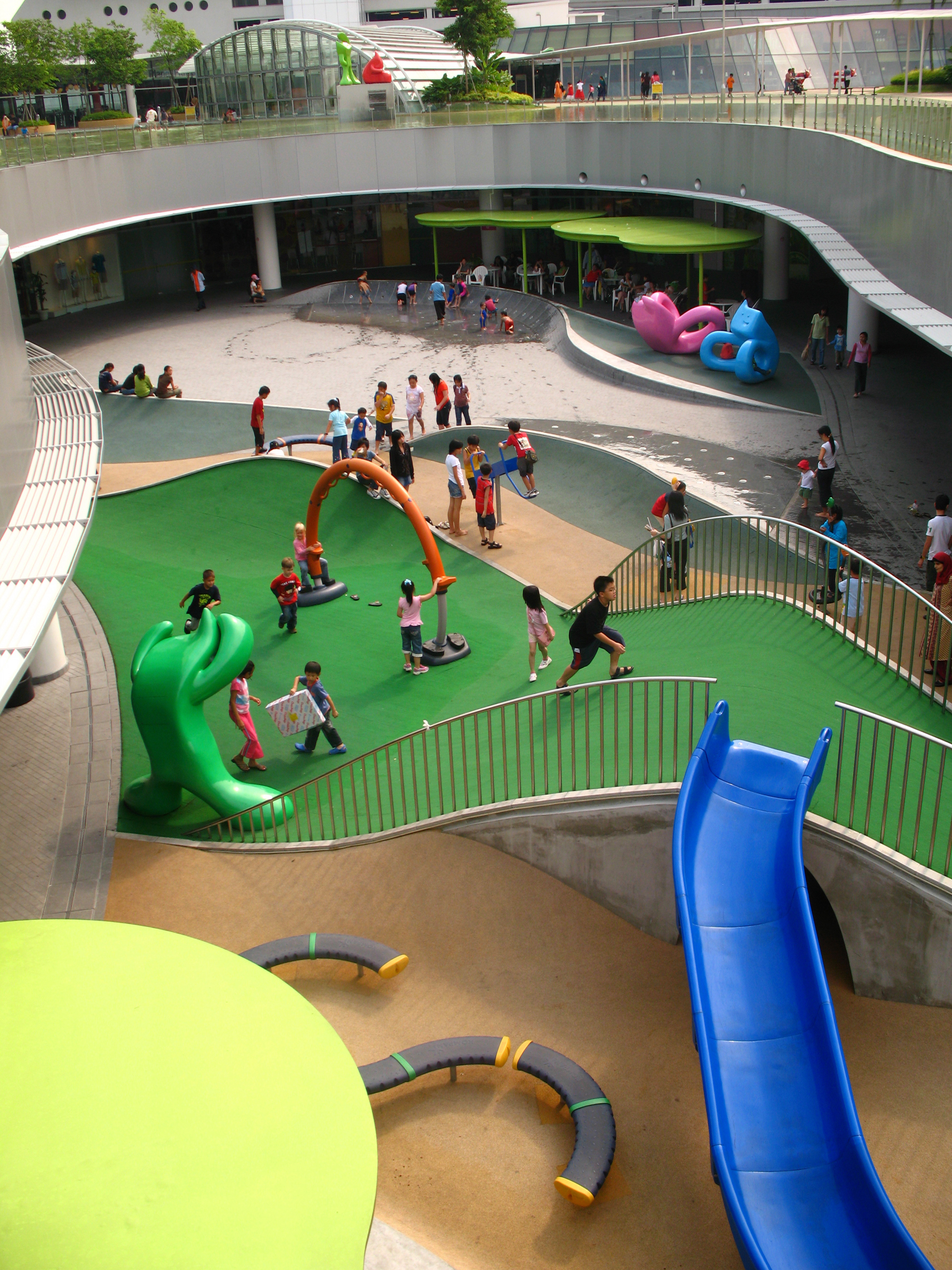
Play Court

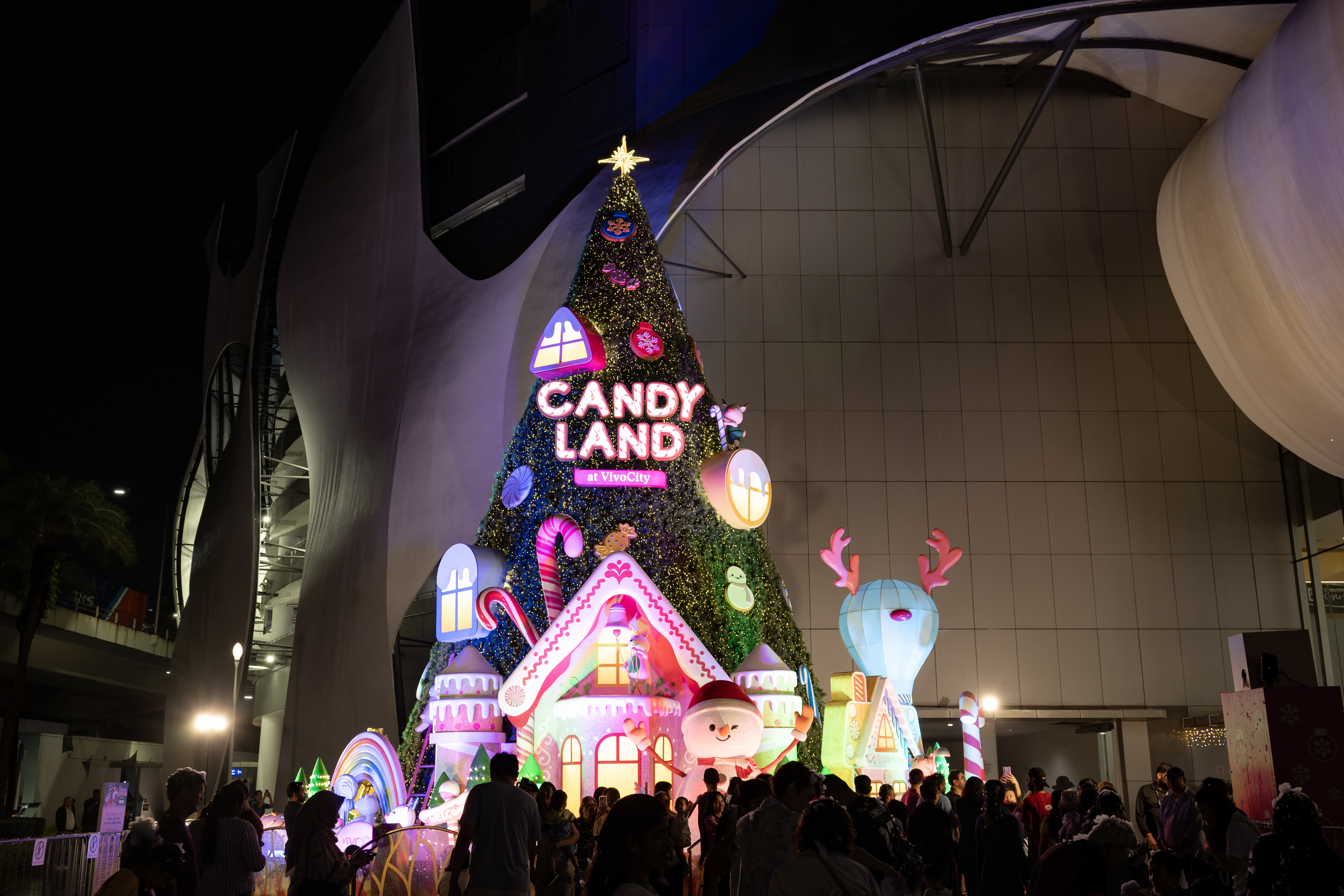
VivoCity Christmas Decoration and Celebrations in 2025.

VivoCity is a shopping mall located in the HarbourFront precinct of Bukit Merah, Singapore. It is the largest shopping mall in Singapore, with 99,987 square metres (1,076,250 square feet) of net lettable area and 142,854 square metres (1,537,670 square feet) of gross floor area spread over a three-storey shopping complex and two basement levels.

It was designed by the Japanese architect Toyo Ito, and its name is derived from the word vivacity. In December 2016, VivoCity was recognized by Forbes as one of the top shopping malls in Singapore.

== History ==
VivoCity was built on the site of the Expo Gateway and Harbour Pavilion exhibition halls of the former World Trade Centre (now the HarbourFront Centre) in June 2003. Since its opening in 2006, it is currently the largest shopping mall in Singapore, spanning 1,500,000 square feet (140,000 m^{2}) of gross floor area and 1,077,000 square feet (100,100 m^{2}) of retail space, larger than Suntec City and Ngee Ann City (the former of which was the largest before VivoCity's opening). It was designed by the renowned Japanese architect Toyo Ito. Mapletree Investments, a subsidiary of Temasek Holdings, is the developer of the S$417 million complex.

=== Official opening ===
The shopping mall opened officially on 1 December 2006 after a topping-out ceremony on 18 April and a soft launch on 7 October that year. The official opening included a six-minute fireworks display, a concert by American band String Theory for the general public, and Stefanie Sun concert at the mall's amphitheatre at the Sky Park on the third floor.

The String Theory concert included a giant harp with strings stretching to the third floor of the mall. A giant projection screen was also set up at the main entrance of the mall; broadcasting Stefanie Sun's concert.

The guest of honour of the event was chairman of Temasek Holdings and former cabinet minister S. Dhanabalan. During its first month of opening, it attracted 4.2 million visitors, equivalent to the population of Singapore, and attracted 7.28 million visitors in total before the grand opening.

=== Countdown and tenancy changes ===
VivoCity served as the official venue for the live televised countdown to the new year, instead of Sentosa as in previous years.

The 2007 Countdown, held from 31 December 2006 to 1 January 2007, was held at the rooftop amphitheatre and included performances by well-known homegrown artists from Mediacorp Channel 5 and 8, as well as the Top 11 finalists of the second season of Singapore Idol.

The 2008 Countdown, held from 31 December 2007 to 1 January 2008, which showcased Taufik Batisah, Daren Tan Sze Wei, and the Deal Or No Deal girls in addition to artists from Channel 5 and 8. Before the actual countdown party, fans were treated to a 50-minute showcase for the solo and group winners of the Channel 5 talent competition "Live The Dream", as well as performances by the other finalists of that competition.

The 2009 Countdown, from 31 December 2008 to 1 January 2009 was held. This time it was for the artists from Channel 8 and U instead of those from Channel 5. Since then, Channel 5 will hold its Countdown from The Float @ Marina Bay. It also held the following countdowns from 2010 to 2013, but since 2013 it was stopped.

In July 2018, VivoCity launched a new Basement 1 extension mall spanning 3,000 square metres. The new B1 extension is accessible via a new escalator lobby, Lobby R, situated right next to the Kopitiam food court.

Giant, Cold Storage, and Guardian previously leased a space under Vivomart brand before moving out on 17 February 2019. The space is now occupied by FairPrice Xtra on 16 July 2019.

In January 2019, the library@harbourfront, was also opened, permanently replacing TEMT and briefly replacing Daiso and The Pet Safari, out of which they were closed down by March 2018. library@harbourfront replaces the Bukit Merah Public Library, and it is located at level 3. It is the biggest library to be located within the mall. The name keeps in line with the tourist libraries such as Chinatown, Orchard, and Esplanade. Daiso eventually reopened in the mall on 15 January 2020 but as a smaller outlet located at level 2, while The Pet Safari occupies a location adjacent to the library.

== Facilities ==
As one of the venues of the inaugural Singapore Biennale in 2006, several commissioned art pieces from established designers around the world were unveiled in VivoCity. It is the only venue of the Singapore Biennale where the exhibits are permanent. An international student design contest was held to find designs to incorporate into the architecture of VivoCity; which received 365 public submissions.

There is a car park with a total of 2,179 lots. The car parks are located in basements 1 and 2 as well as from levels 2 to 7, whilst a Rooftop carpark at level 7.

An outdoor pedestrian bridge on level 2 (near the Golden Village Cinema) is linked to St James Power Station and a walkway that also connects to HarbourFront Centre.

== Transportation ==
The VivoCity terminal station of the Sentosa Express monorail is located on level 3 (next to the Food Republic food court). It was officially opened on 15 January 2007 as Sentosa Station @ VivoCity, and renamed to its current name in April 2019. There is a bus stop in front of VivoCity, connecting it to Resorts World Sentosa. The linkway at basement 2 and level 1 connects to HarbourFront MRT station and HarbourFront Bus Interchange.

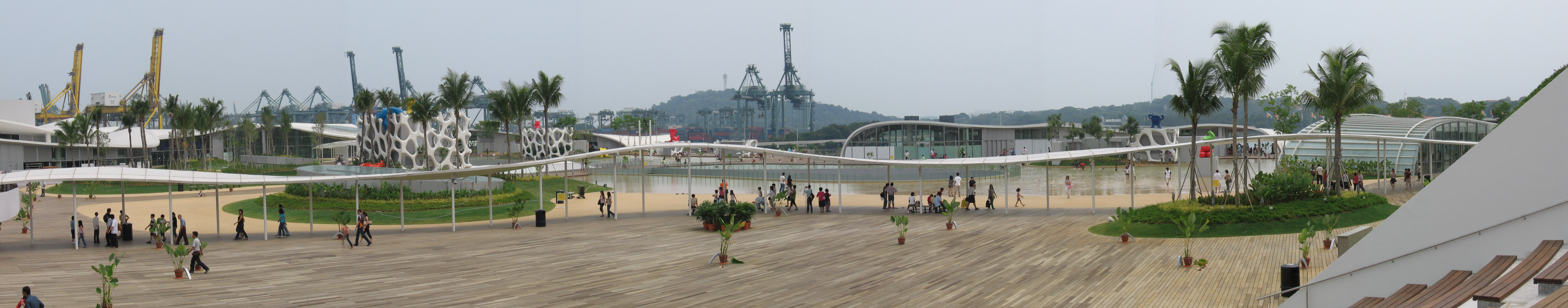
VivoCity's rooftop, which features a wading pool.
