= Food Republic =

Singaporean food court chain

Food Republic (Chinese: 大食代; pinyin: Dàshídài) is a food court chain run by the BreadTalk Group based in Singapore.

The concept combines local hawker fare with mini restaurants (some of which have exclusive seating) in an open dining concept. Some stalls are also run from standalone pushcarts. Food Republic's elaborate decor and furniture are designed to invoke a nostalgic kampong atmosphere.

== History ==
In October 2005, BreadTalk launched its first food court, Food Republic, at Wisma Atria.

== Locations ==
There are currently fourteen branches in Singapore, which are open at Wisma Atria, 313@Somerset, VivoCity, Suntec City, NEX, Parkway Parade, City Square, BreadTalk IHQ, Causeway Point, Westgate, Shaw House, Manulife and Capitol Piazza. In addition, the group operates a food court by the name of Food Opera at ION Orchard together with Tea Loft with high prices that have attracted much attention by the media and the general public.

The Wisma Atria branch seats 900 people while the VivoCity one is slightly bigger and also has a Toast Box outlet attached.

=== International operations ===
The chain has five branches in Hong Kong, which are located at Prudential Centre in Jordan, Citygate Outlets in Tung Chung, Silvercord in Tsim Sha Tsui, Domain (Hong Kong) in Yau Tong and Olympian City in Tai Kok Tsui. Silvercord branch and Olympian City branch also have Toast Box outlets attached. Toast Box also has branches located at the basement level of Times Square in Causeway Bay and On Shing Terrace of Taikoo Shing. BreadTalk has also had a branch in Viva Beijing, Beijing, at which breadtalk is directly connected to.

In Malaysia, there is a branch located at the basement level of Pavilion Kuala Lumpur in Bukit Bintang. It also opened its latest outlet in Malaysia at Pavilion Bukit Jalil, located at Level 1.

In 2011, Food Republic opened ten branches in Jakarta, Indonesia: Pacific Place, Grand Indonesia, Pondok Indah Mall 3, Mal Kelapa Gading, Mall of Indonesia, PIK Avenue, Neo Soho Podomoro City, Lippo Mall Puri, and Summarecon Mall Serpong.

In 2012, Food Republic expanded into Taiwan. It opened three branches in Taiwan: in Banchiao, Taipei City, and Kaohsiung. The most recent of the three opened in Taipei in the first floor of the Carrefour building in Neihu.

Food Republic entered Thailand in 2012, with its first location at CentralPlaza Grand Rama IX. It operated up to six branches in Bangkok, but began closing down in 2021. It is scheduled to exit the country by the end of 2024.

In 2015, Food Republic opened four branches in Tokyo, Japan.

In 2016, Food Republic opened a branch in Disneytown, which is a shopping district in Shanghai Disney Resort.

In 2017, Food Republic opened two branches at Shenzhen, China.

== Gallery ==
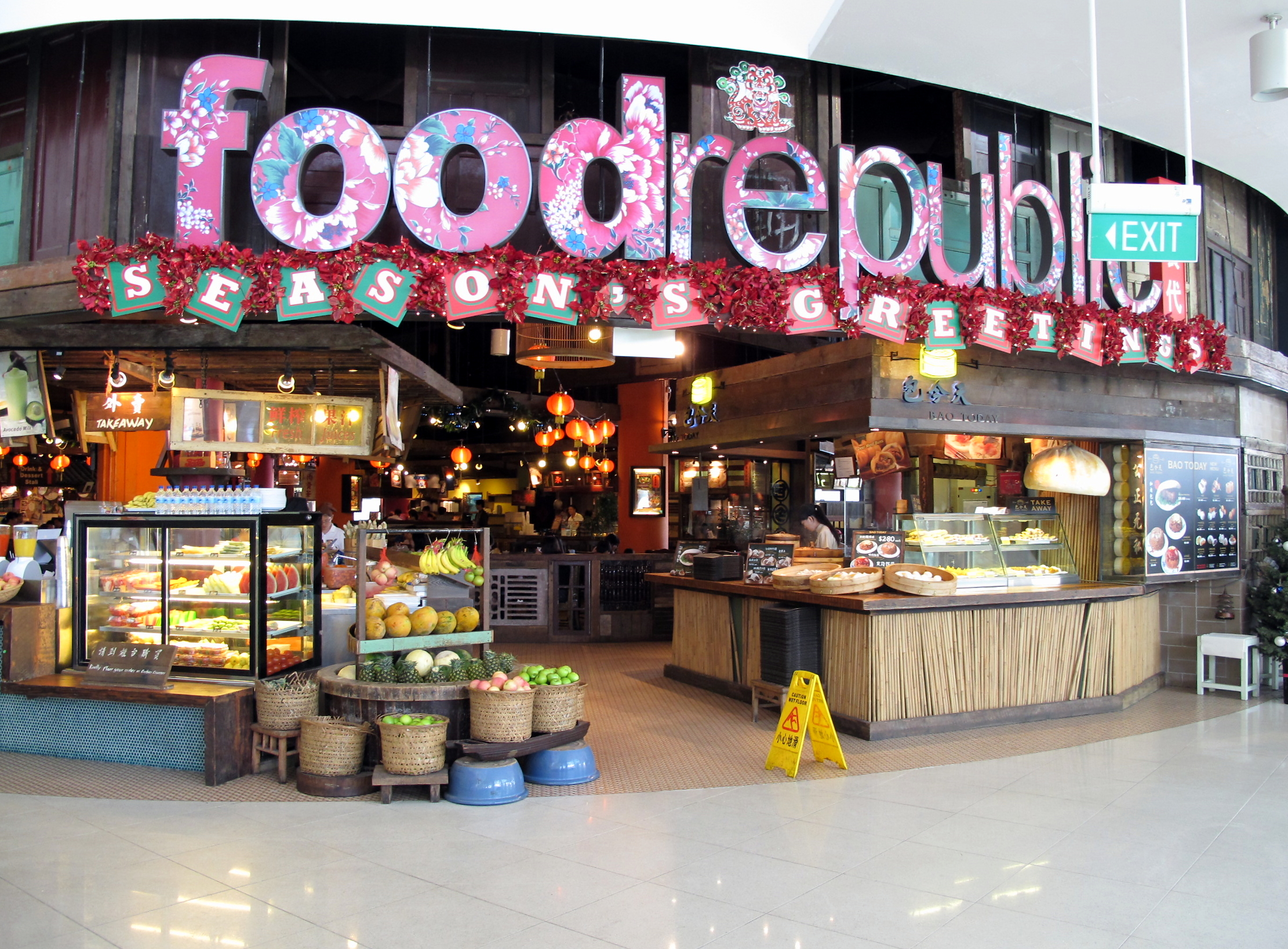
Food Republic outlet on level 3 of VivoCity, Singapore

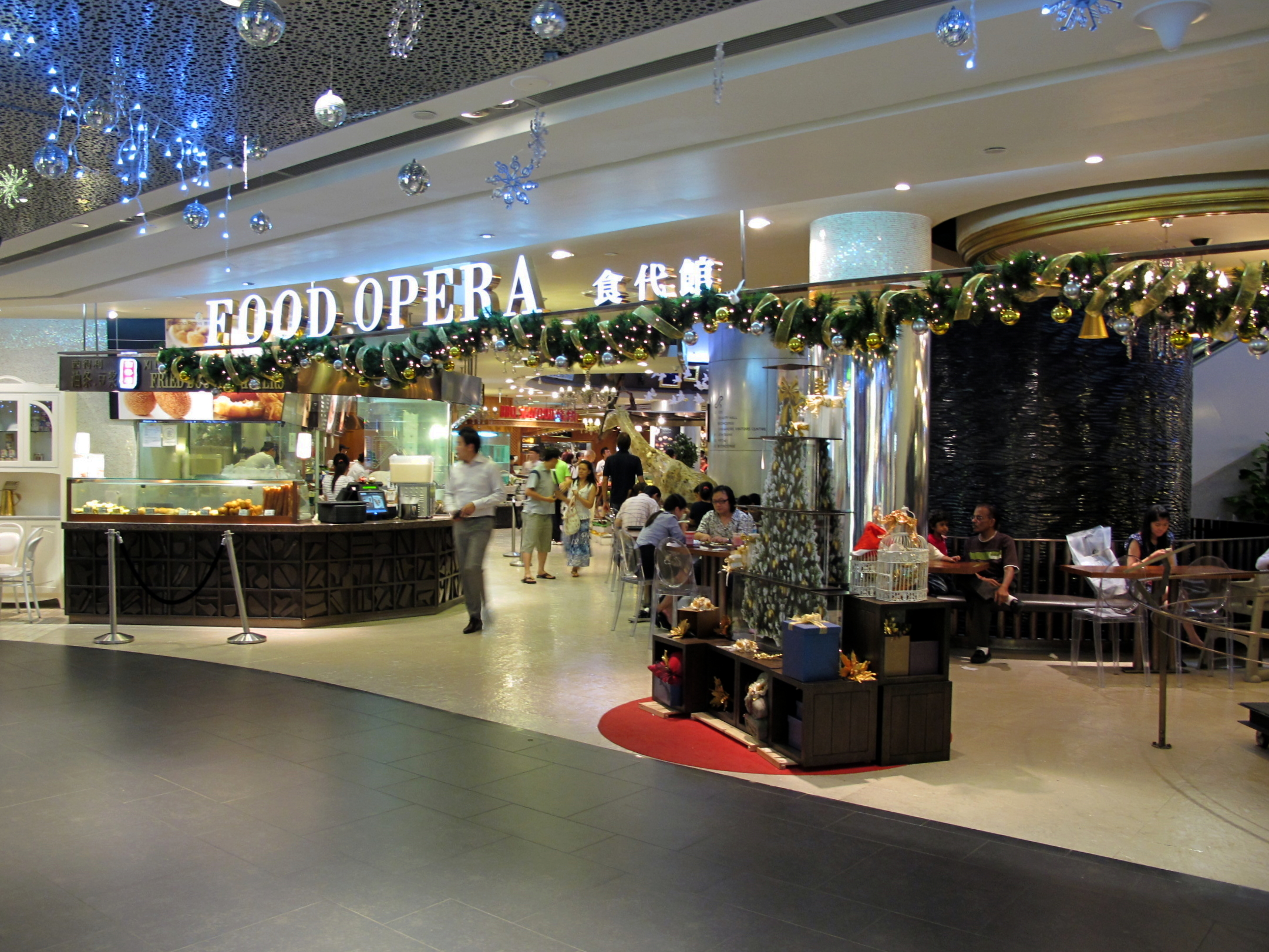
Food Opera at ION Orchard, Singapore

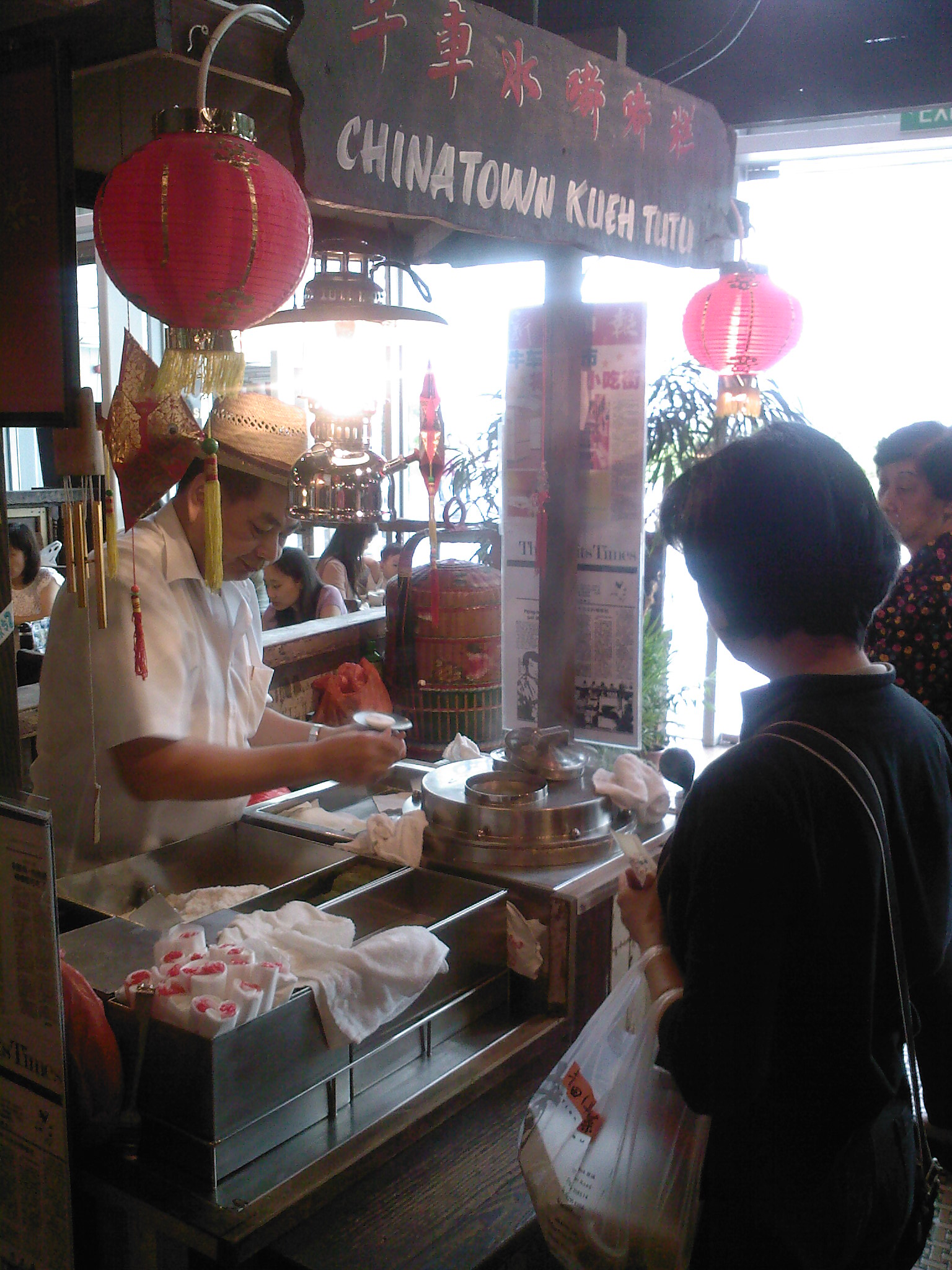
A stall selling kueh tutu (VivoCity outlet).

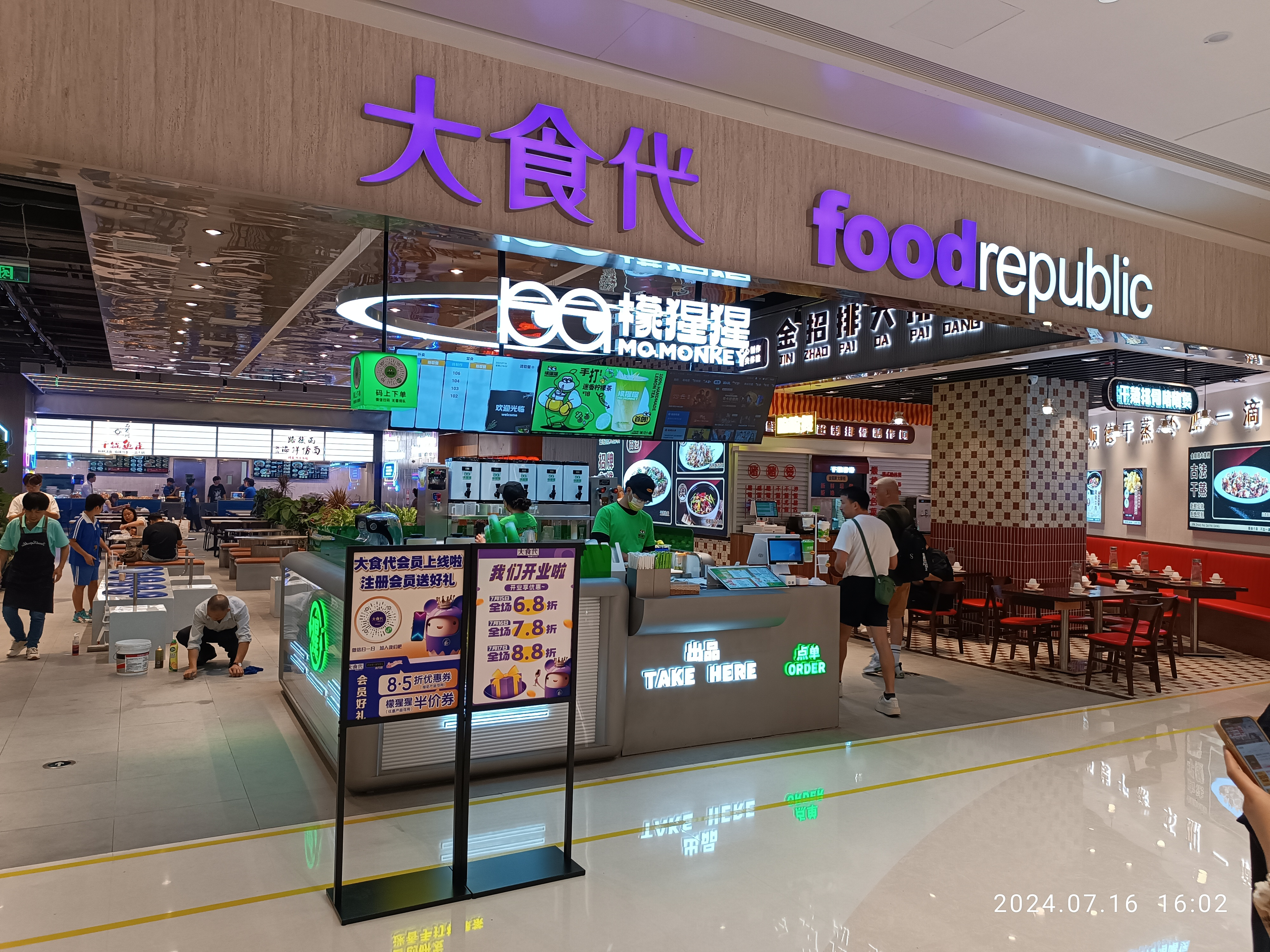
Food Republic outlet at Coastal City, Shenzhen, China

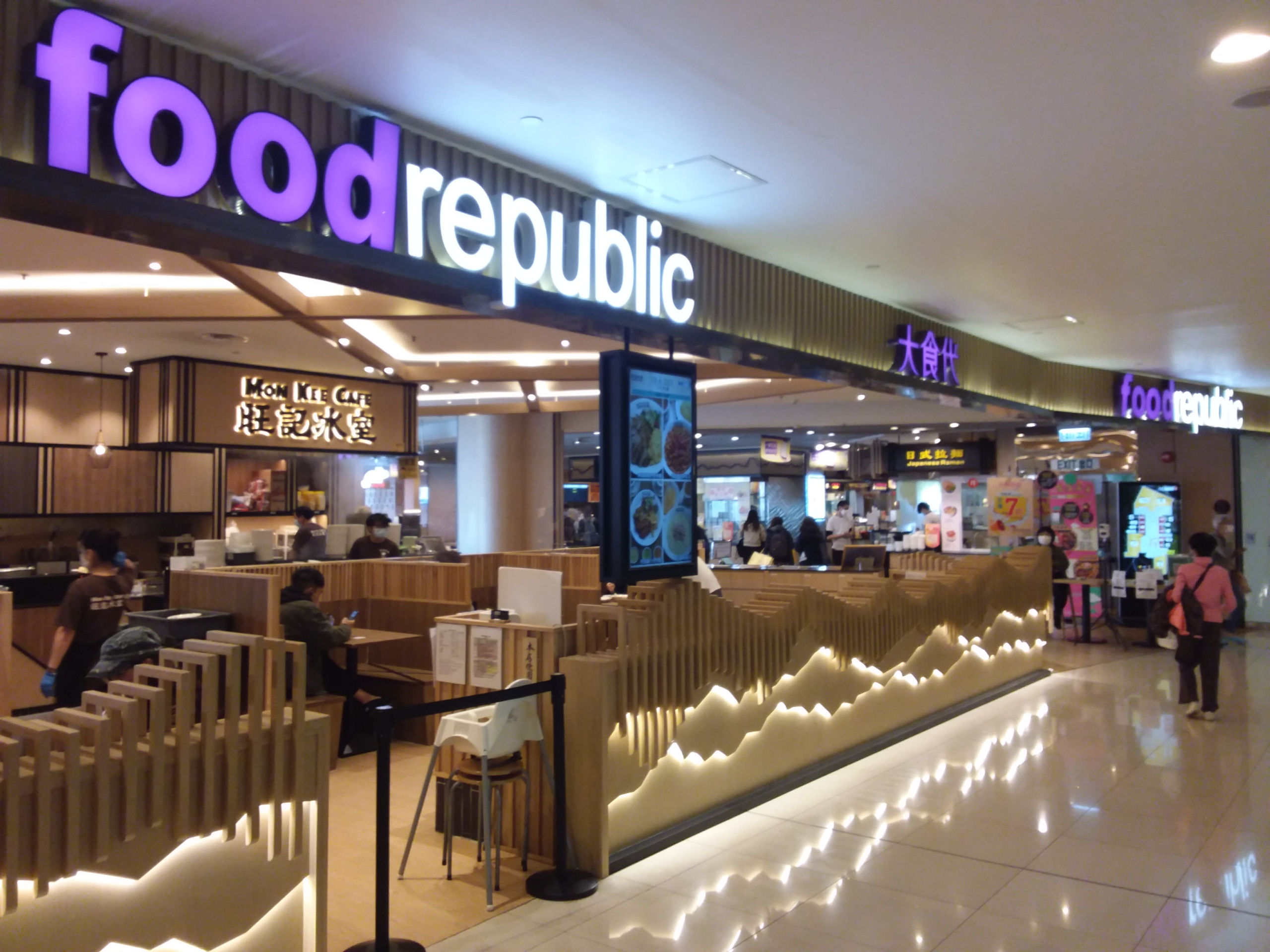
Food Republic outlet at Domain Mall, Hong Kong
