= Silvercord =

- 新港中心
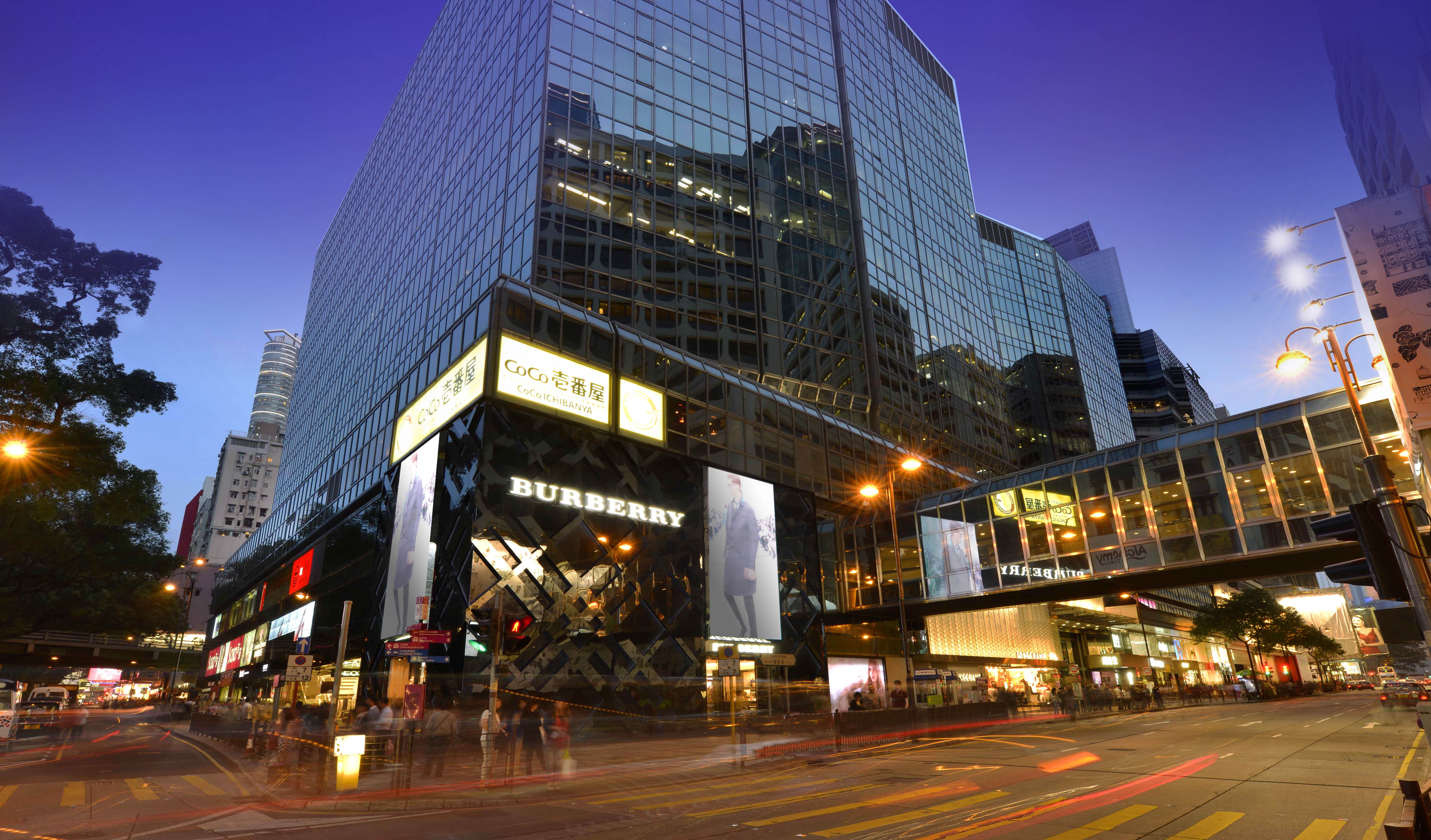
- Silvercord shopping centre
- Address: No. 30 Canton Road, Tsim Sha Tsui, Yau Tsim Mong District, Hong Kong
- Opened: 1984; 42 years ago
- Owner: Cheung Kong Holdings
- Floors: 17
- Website: silvercord.hk

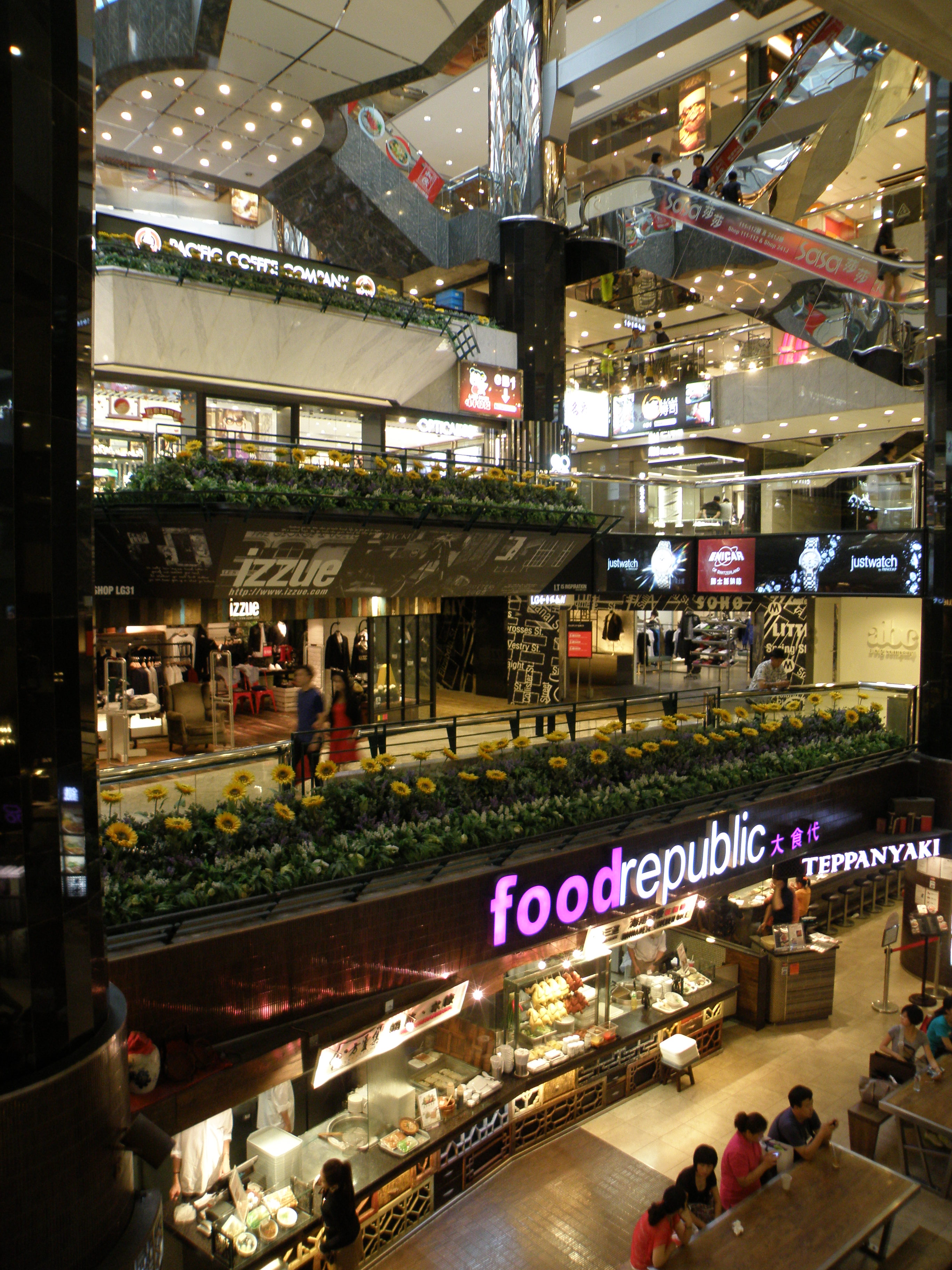
Atrium of shopping centre.

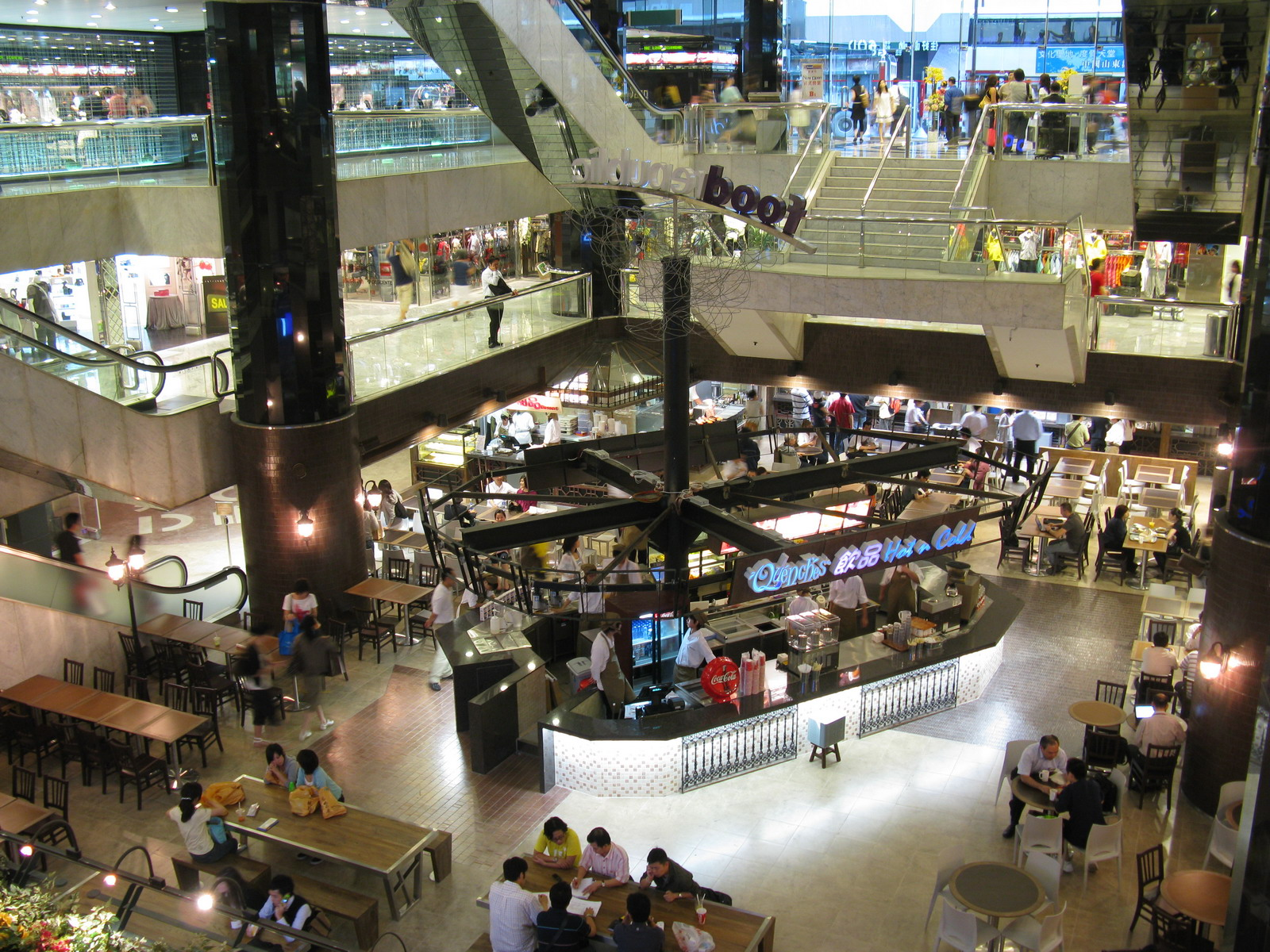
Food Republic food court in the basement of the Silvercord shopping centre.

Silvercord (Chinese: 新港中心) is a shopping centre and office tower complex located at No. 30 Canton Road, at the junction with Haiphong Road, in Tsim Sha Tsui, Hong Kong. The complex, owned by Cheung Kong Holdings, was opened in 1984.

== Shopping centre ==
Tenants of the shopping centre include:

Basement

- namco (First store Hong Kong）→Cooked Deli by citysuper→Food Republic

Low-rise

- FINGERCOXX, FRED PERRY, UNDERGROUND, DOUBLE-PARK, Big Company, StayReal, STAGE, another, MANHATTAN PORTAGE

First floor

- Longchamp, BURBERRY, GUESS, BENETTON, SaSa, COLOURMIX, The Body Shop, Calvin Klein JEANS, ICE WATCH, MERCIBEAUCOUP, KATIE JUDITH, CAMPER

Second floor

- PEACH JOHN, TITICACA, AnthonG, Crumpler, My A La Mod, Morellato

Third floor

- Din Tai Fung restaurant

Former tenants include:

- a Hard Rock Cafe restaurant was located at G/F and 1/F. It closed on November 24, 2008.
