= Keppel Island, Singapore =

Small private island of Singapore

Keppel Island
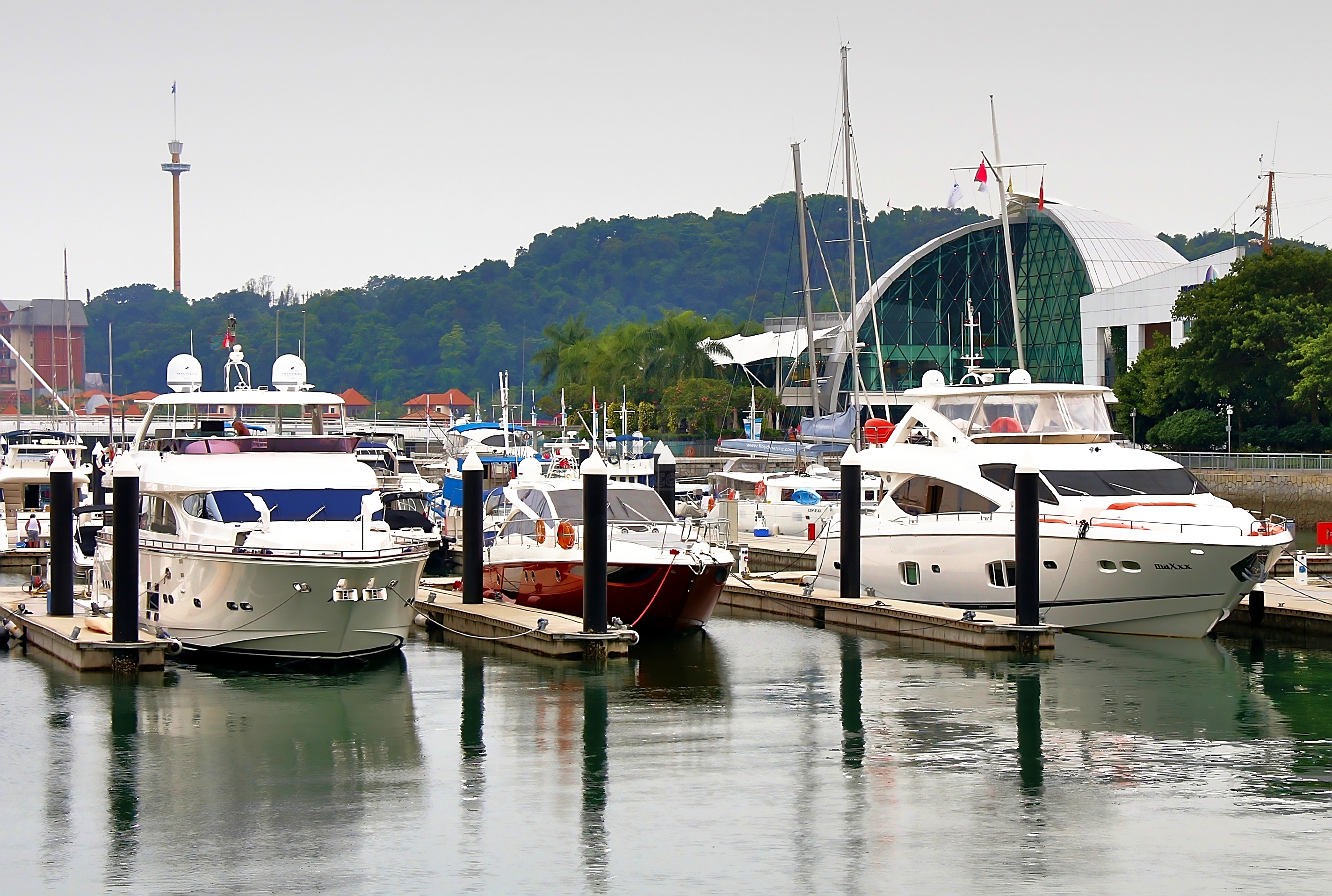
- The marina on Keppel Island

- Location within Singapore

Geography
- Location: Keppel Bay
- Coordinates: 1°15′48.93″N 103°48′42.38″E

Administration
- Singapore

Additional information
- Time zone: SST (UTC+8)

Keppel Island is a small private island located in the precinct of HarbourFront in Bukit Merah, Singapore. The island is largely flat, situated in northern part of Keppel Bay, between Singapore's main island and the island of Sentosa.

Keppel Island is connected to Singapore's main island by the 250 m long cable stayed Keppel Bay Bridge, which opened in 2008. Keppel Bay Bridge also carries the lines for electricity, water, and other services to the island.

== History ==
The island became prosperous in mid-19th century thanks to the development of the Keppel Harbour. Keppel Island was used for shipbuilding and ship repair operations by Keppel Shipyard until 2000.

The island was previously known as Pulau Hantu, which means "Ghost Island" in Malay. In 1983, the company that owned the island changed the name to Keppel Island. As the previous name was deemed to be disagreeable for some and Pulau Hantu being the name of another island in Singapore, the government allowed the change.

The island was part of a waterfront luxury development effort in 2008, and it was thereafter connected to the mainland via the construction of the Keppel Bay Bridge.

Today, Keppel Island houses high-end restaurants and a marina for yachts.
