= String Theory (band) =

String Theory was an electronic music band from Chicago that existed from 1997 until 2005. The members were Joshua R. Davison and Nathan T. Tucker. Contemporaries included Casino vs Japan, Pulseprogramming, and Telefon Tel Aviv.

The two now work as the Thorny Tigers production team and are 2/3 of the band Parks & Gardens with Andy Duncan formerly of Ok Go.

== Discography ==
=== Releases ===
- SMAK 03/04 12" - Skam Records, 2001: double 12" with Made (band)
- Anhedonia CD/LP - Consumer's Research and Development, 2002
- Magic Arrows / String Theory FEW-005 7" - Frank Wobbly & Sons, 2004
- Radiovalerian CD/LP - Wobblyhead Records, 2004
- Rubyray MP3 - Electrochelou Web Label, 2005

=== Remixes/Compilations ===
- String Theory Meets Salvo Beta Uptown at Manzebel Retbeats (Remix for Salvo Beta) - Evil Against Evil CD and 12" 2002
- Bloopalong, Tevatron, Jusaan - SMAK 2CD - Skam Records, 2002: CD of Smak 12" series
- Stepp In/Out - Lumptronic 5: Lumpenwave - Lumpen Magazine, 2002
- Ambulette - Select #4: Chicago School Select Media, 2002
- Dregs (Miles Tilmann Remix) - Hazardous Materials CD Compilation - Consumers Research and Development 2005
