= HarbourFront Centre =

Defunct mall and ferry terminal

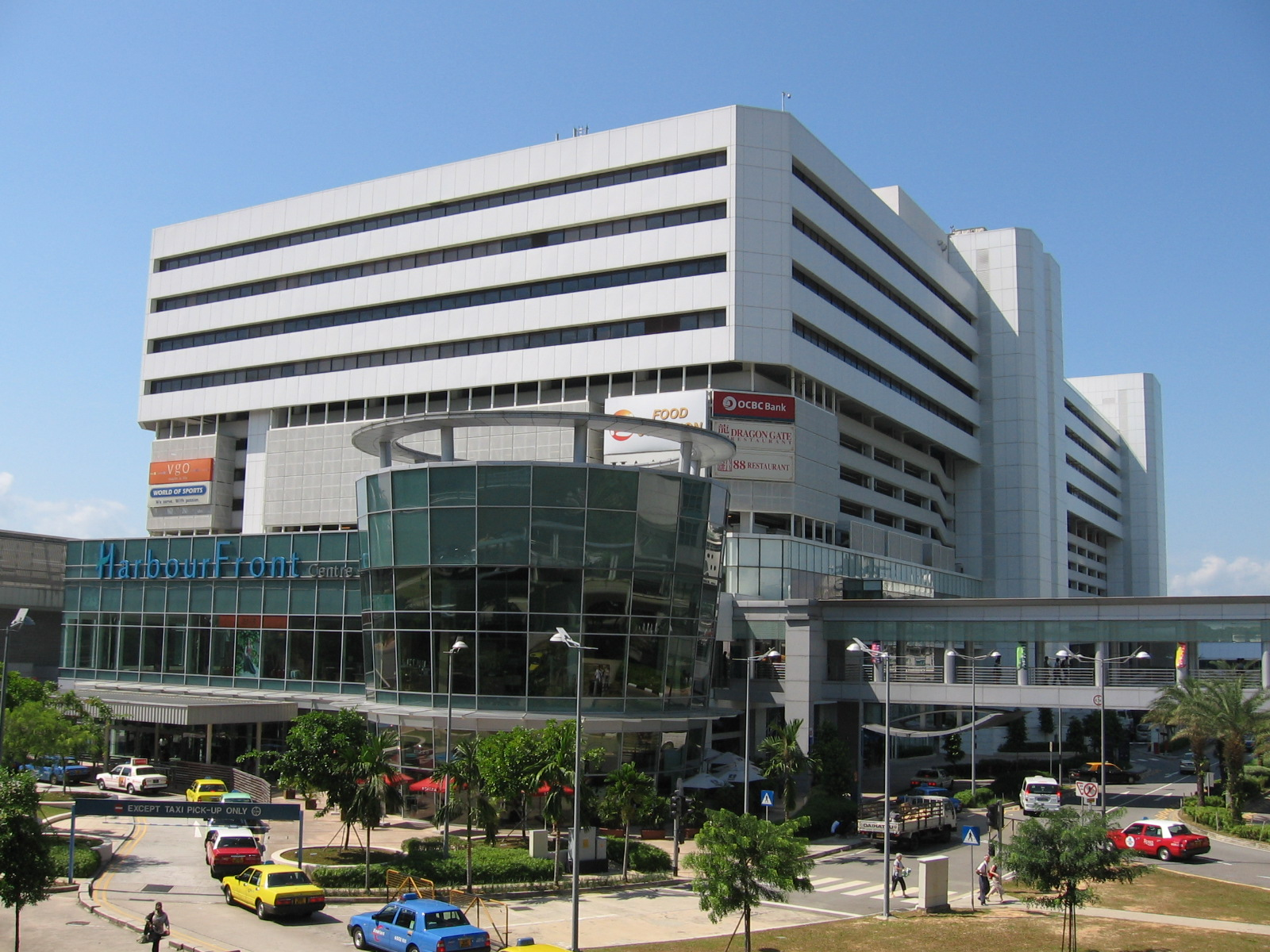

- Location within Singapore
- Former names: World Trade Centre

General information
- Status: Permanently closed
- Location: HarbourFront, Singapore, 1 Maritime Square, Singapore 099253
- Coordinates: 1°15′52″N 103°49′12″E
- Opening: 1977; 49 years ago (World Trade Centre); 17 February 2003; 23 years ago (HarbourFront Centre)
- Closed: 27 July 2026; 3 months ago
- Owner: Mapletree Investments

Technical details
- Floor count: 14
- Floor area: 100,000 square feet (9,300 m^{2})

Design and construction
- Developer: Mapletree Investments

Other information
- Public transit: NE1 CC29 HarbourFront; HarbourFront

Website
- www.harbourfrontcentre.com.sg

HarbourFront Centre, formerly World Trade Centre, was a shopping mall and ferry terminal in Singapore. The mall was part of a development known as HarbourFront.

== History ==
Plans of building the World Trade Centre was first announced by the Port of Singapore Authority in 1973. It was officially opened in 1977, as well as having a ferry terminal that has traveling routes to nearby Indonesian ports, as well as the city of Batam and Bintan Island, it also featured nearby Expo Gateway and Harbour Pavilion exhibition halls.

The World Trade Centre hosted Miss Universe Pageant in 1987.

The World Trade Centre was later renovated from January 2000 with a connection to HarbourFront MRT station, and was reopened as HarbourFront Centre on 17 February 2003.

== Redevelopment ==
Plans of redeveloping HarbourFront Centre was announced by Mapletree Investments in 2025. It was closed on 27 July 2026 to be redeveloped into a 33-storey building with office and retail spaces. The new building is expected to be completed in the first half of 2031, in line with the vision of rejuvenating the HarbourFront precinct.

The existing cruise and ferry terminal was relocated to an interim terminal at 5 HarbourFront Avenue, 70 meters away from its current location. Batam Fast Ferry started operations at the new location on 7 July, while all other ferry operators started on 15 July 2026, culminating with the closure of the ferry terminal, the Singapore Cruise Centre at HarbourFront Centre.

Preceded by Atlapa Convention Centre; Panama City	Miss Universe venue 1987	Succeeded by Lin Kou Stadium (Taiwan) Taipei
