= The Great Madras =

Coordinates: 1°18′18″N 103°51′11″E

The Great Madras, formerly the Grand Madras Hotel, is a boutique hotel in Singapore. Initially a Singapore Improvement Trust block, it became the Grand Madras Hotel in 1990s.

== Description ==
The design of the Art Deco building is similar to other Singapore Improvement Trust residential blocks along Seng Poh Road in Tiong Bahru. It features column bases of Shanghai plaster and a real spiral staircase and its balconies feature "fair-faced" brickwork. A customised wallpaper "depicting Singapore's multifaceted history and daily life" has been installed in the hotel. The first floor of the building is occupied by eight hostel rooms. Other rooms in the hotel include The Great Suite, which features an open-concept bathroom, and The Balcony Room, which features an outdoor balcony. Facilities at the hotel include an outdoor soaking pool and a Catalonian-themed cafe.

== History ==
The hotel was initially built as a residential block by the Singapore Improvement Trust, a predecessor to the Housing and Development Board, in the 1940s. In the 1990s, the building became the Grand Madras Hotel. It underwent a 24-month restoration and refurbishment which was completed in 2018. A specialist contractor was involved in restoring the building's "signature but corroded" mild-steel framed windows. The newly-restored building was a winner of the 2018 Architectural Heritage Awards by the Urban Redevelopment Authority. Ankita Varma of The Straits Times wrote that the hotel "is a charming addition to a heritage neighbourhood and succeeds in its attempt to celebrate a bygone era."
