= 78 Moh Guan Terrace =

Flats in Tiong Bahru, Singapore

Coordinates: 1.2835°N 103.8282°E

78 Moh Guan Terrace, also known as The Horse-shoe Block, is a Singapore Improvement Trust (SIT) block in Tiong Bahru, Singapore. It the only block in Singapore with the unique "horse-shoe" design.

== History ==
Constructed between 1939 and 1940 by the SIT, the predecessor to the Housing Development Board, 78 Moh Guan Terrace was one of the largest flats in Tiong Bahru. Due to the position of the block, only some parts of the building will have the address 78 Moh Guan Terrace, while others will have either 78 Yong Siak Street or 78 Guan Chuan Street. The building was one of the first public housing blocks in Singapore built with an air-raid shelter. However, the air-raid shelter ended up being seldom used, as Tiong Bahru was not targeted during the Japanese occupation of Singapore. The building also houses the Hua Bee Restaurant.

The building was gazetted as a conserved building in 2003. The building was also included in the Tiong Bahru Heritage Trail in 2013 by the National Heritage Board.
