= COO Boutique Hostel and Sociatel =

Hostel in Singapore

- Interactive map of the COO Boutique Hostel and Sociatel area

General information
- Architectural style: Cultural
- Classification: Hostel, Bistro, Sociatel
- Location: 259 Outram Road, Singapore
- Coordinates: 1.28504°N 103.83478°E
- Estimated completion: 2016

Design and construction
- Other designers: Ministry of Design

Website
- http://www.staycoo.com/connect/log-in

COO Boutique Hostel & Sociatel is a hostel located along Outram road, within the Tiong Bahru district in Singapore. It is Singapore's first 'Sociatel' brand. The entity is known for their architectural design, being awarded the "Visual Identity of the Year" at Ahead Asia Awards 2017. The project occupies 752 square meters and was completed in 2016.
