= MUP =

MUP may refer to:

- Main Upgrading Programme, a housing programme in Singapore.
- Major urinary proteins
- Master of Urban Planning
- Manchester University Press
- Melbourne University Press (or Publishing)
- Metropolitan University Prague
- Ministry of Internal Affairs (Serbia) (Ministarstvo Unutrašnjih Poslova)
- Ministry of the Interior (Croatia) (Ministarstvo Unutarnjih Poslova)
- Miss Universe Philippines
- Motor unit potential
- Multi-use path, a path shared by pedestrians and cyclists
- Multiple UNC Provider - a concept related to Microsoft Windows Universal Naming Convention (UNC)
- An alternate representation of μP, which is an abbreviation for microprocessor
- Popular Unity Movement (French: Mouvement d'Unité Populaire), Tunisian political party
- The ISO 639-3 code for the Malvi language
