= Tiong Bahru Air Raid Shelter =

Air raid shelter in Singapore

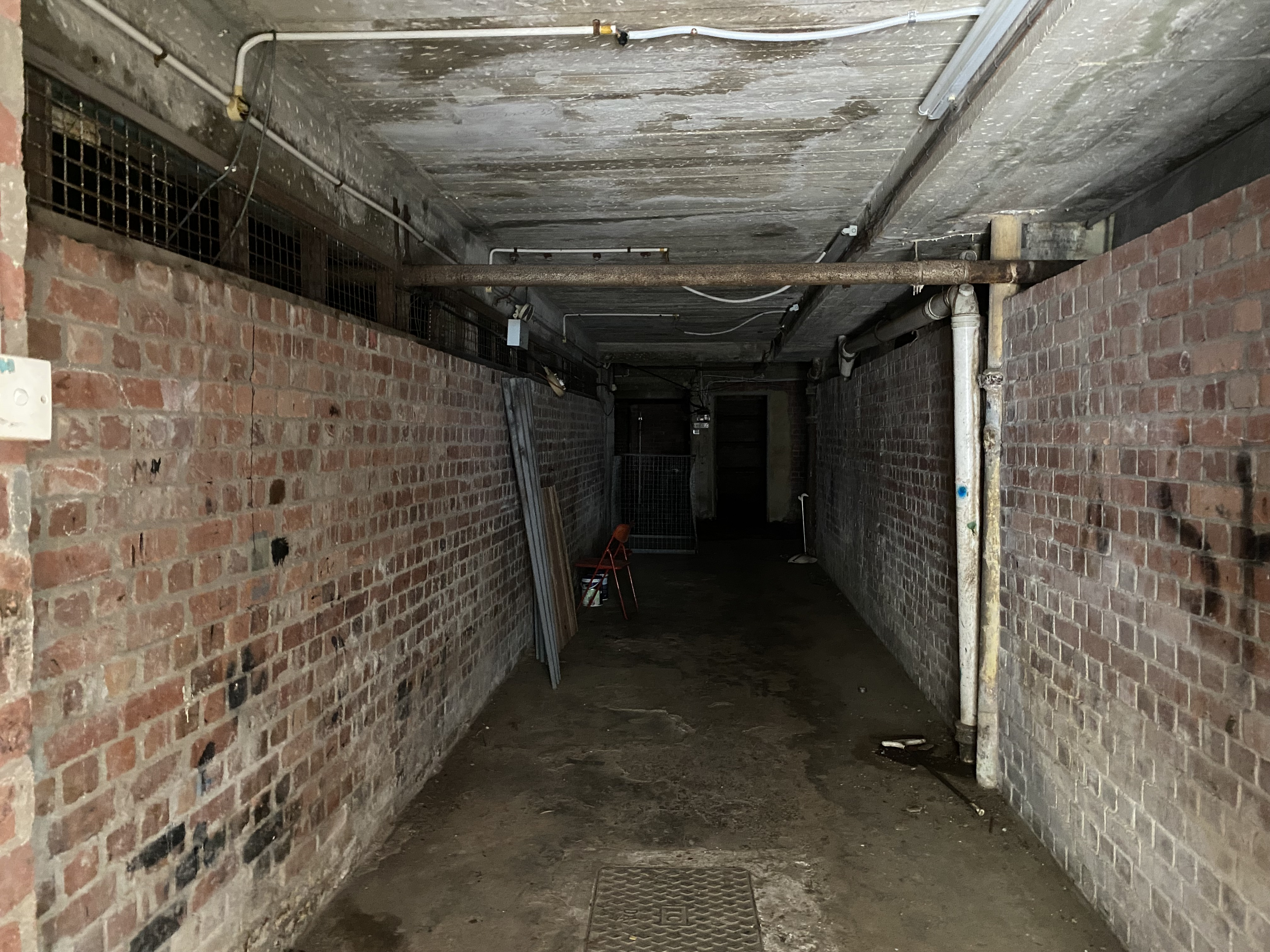
Tiong Bahru Air Raid Shelter in Singapore, 6 May 2023

Tiong Bahru Air Raid Shelter is a converted air raid shelter built between 1939 and 1941 at block 78 within the Tiong Bahru neighbourhood in Singapore. The shelter is preserved and is part of a heritage trail of the neighbourhood.

== Construction ==
Tiong Bahru's block 78's semi-basement was to be playgrounds, however had an option to be converted into an air raid shelter in times of emergency. The air raid shelter was converted from three play pavilions and four garages located at the semi-basement of block 78, which straddles Moh Guan Terrace and Guan Chuan Street. The walls of the shelter are 19 inches thick, and the floor is made of concrete. The shelters would cost $16,000 and could accommodate up to 2,000 people.

== Post–war ==
In February 2012, it served as a museum for a short time before it was closed. The shelter would remain closed to the public, with exception to those who are being brought on guided heritage tours.
