= Main Upgrading Programme =

The Main Upgrading Programme, or MUP (Chinese: 主要翻新), was formally launched as the Singapore government’s pioneer housing upgrading programme in 1992, by then Prime Minister Mr Goh Chok Tong. Under the MUP, residents enjoyed an improved living environment without the need to move out from their familiar surroundings. The MUP has been brought to 128 precincts island-wide, benefitting 131,000 households.

== History ==
In 1992, the government experimented with the concept of upgrading HDB flats while they were still being occupied on 6 precincts in a Demonstration Phase. These precincts were in Marine Parade, Kim Keat, Telok Blangah, Ang Mo Kio, Lorong Lew Lian and Clementi. The Demonstration Phase was a success, and was hence, expanded island-wide.

Under the MUP, improvements are carried out to the precinct's surroundings, the blocks, as well as within each individual dwelling unit.

The programme was absorbed into Home Improvement Programme in 2007.

The priority of HDB upgrading programme was linked to support by electoral wards, as stated by then-Prime Minister Goh Chok Tong, "by linking the priority of upgrading to electoral support, we focus the minds of voters on the link between upgrading and the people whose policies make it possible. This has the desired result." It has been used as a tool to canvass votes for PAP politicians campaigning in eligible opposition-held constituencies, such as Eric Low in the 2006 general elections.
