= Tiong Bahru =

- Subzone of Bukit Merah Planning Area & Housing Estate

Name transcription(s)
  - Chinese: 中峇鲁 (Simplified) 中峇魯 (Traditional); Zhōngbālǔ (Pinyin); Tiong-bā-ló͘ (Hokkien POJ)
  - Malay: Tiong Bahru (Rumi) تيوڠ بهرو (Jawi)
  - Tamil: தியோங் பாரு Tiyōṅ pāru (Transliteration)
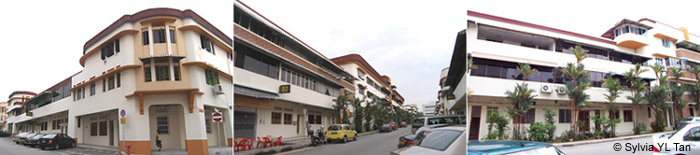
- SIT (Singapore Improvement Trust) flats in Tiong Bahru
- Interactive map of Tiong Bahru
- Coordinates: 1.28495°N 103.82359°E
- Country: Singapore
- Planning area: Bukit Merah Planning Area

Tiong Bahru is a housing estate and subzone region located within Bukit Merah planning area, in the Central Region of Singapore. Tiong Bahru was constructed in the 1920s by the Singapore Improvement Trust, the predecessor to the Housing Development Board (HDB) and an entity of the British colonial authority providing mass public housing in Singapore and is the oldest housing estate in Singapore.

According to URA's definition, the area known as 'Tiong Bahru' is represented by three contiguous subzones of Bukit Merah, namely Tiong Bahru, Tiong Bahru Station and Kampong Tiong Bahru. The namesake subzone refers to the main estate which consists of 54 Walk-up flats with over 900 housing units built by SIT, as well as modern HDB flats and private condominiums along Boon Tiong Road, Kim Tian Road and Chay Yan Street. Tiong Bahru Station subzone refers to the locality that encompasses Tiong Bahru MRT station, Tiong Bahru Plaza and housing developments along Jalan Membina while Kampong Tiong Bahru which refers to the locality around Jalan Bukit Merah and Silat Road.

Since the mid-2000s, Tiong Bahru has undergone rapid gentrification and the neighbourhood has become synonymous with trendy cafes and indie boutiques amid pre-war architecture. In the 2020s, the neighbourhood grown quieter with less cafes and crowd.

== Etymology ==
The name Tiong Bahru means "new cemetery" (thióng, 塚 (Traditional) / 冢 (Simplified) – Hokkien for "cemetery", bahru – Malay for "new"), which was a reference to a cemetery beside the Heng San Teng Burial Ground or the Old Chinese Burial Ground, located at the present site of the Singapore General Hospital.

== Overview ==
The junction of Seng Poh Road and Tiong Bahru Road housed a "bird corner" dating back to the early 1980s. The owners of song birds such as Prinias, Robins, and Shrikes would gather at the corner to meet and chat over tea and coffee. The corner was disrupted by the building of the Link Hotel in 2003. In 2008 the owners of the hotel decided to reopen the structure for hanging birdcages.

Tiong Bahru is a residential neighbourhood in Singapore located near the Central Business District (CBD). The area is known for its older architecture and heritage, which have contributed to its popularity among residents and visitors. The neighbourhood also features murals, art-related businesses and shops.

== History ==
In 1927, 70 acres of land were acquired by Singapore Improvement Trust (SIT) as a test case for a public housing estate. This land was Tiong Bahru, a name derived from the Hokkien word for "tomb" and Malay word for "new". The land was hilly and swampy, with 'squatters of the pig-breeding and coolie types'. To build the first-ever public housing estate in Singapore, the SIT had to remove cemeteries and displace some nearly 2000 squatters, while leveling the hilly terrain by cutting the hills nearly.

The first block of SIT flats, block 55, was ready in December 1936. Its 20 flat units of the total 28 flat units were occupied by 11 families then. It had adopted a similar typology to the shophouse where the ground floor consisted of shops with residential flats above. According to Tan Mok Lee, one of the first residents in the estate, the area was peaceful and had quite many empty flats, due to the costly monthly rent of $25 at that time.

All of the streets in the estate are named after Chinese pioneers of the 19th and early 20th centuries. Chay Yan Street is named after the rubber plantation merchant and philanthropist, Tan Chay Yan. Peng Nguan Street is named after Lim Peng Nguan, an early settler and the father of the community leader Lim Nee Soon. Tiong Bahru was surrounded by the Sit Wah Road and Outram Road. Beyond were mangrove swamp and hillocks.

Tiong Bahru was then also known as 美人窝 ("den of beauties") as it was where wealthy men would keep their mistresses. Due to close proximity to the Great World Amusement Park, there was a predominance of 'pipa girls' within the SIT estate, which is a more polite term for prostitutes. It was speculated that the pipa girls use the staircase access at the back of the flats to entertain the men, and flee whenever the men's wives return.

=== 1939–1945: World War II ===
In 1939, Great Britain declared war on Nazi Germany. In 1940, a series of construction plans were drawn to convert the motor garages at the back of the flats in Seng Poh Road into bomb shelters. By 1941, there were 784 flats, 54 tenements and 33 shops, which housed over 6000 residents. Since then, no new flats were built until the 1950s after the war. As the war drew near, the flats were painted in camouflage colours. Residents had also recalled at least two bombs landing on the estate during the Japanese occupation. The war had also brought widespread destruction of dwellings and overall overcrowding of slums with deterioration of hygiene conditions.

The bomb shelters built around 1940 were effective in providing refuge for many residents during the Japanese occupation. Then, Japanese soldiers who used British prisoners-of-war to perform duties and labour on site occupied many flats, which were also used as brothels and gambling dens.

=== 1946–1959: Housing shortage ===
The SIT's pre-war housing output of 2112 units was insufficient to meet the housing shortage as it only provided about 100 units per year. As a result, the committee planned a three-year immediate housing programme to alleviate the problem. As a result, a total of 1258 flats were added in Tiong Bahru. They were built in differently from the pre-war flats and had a communal dwelling concept, with open courtyard spaces. These flats were housed by approximately 17,000 people in the 1950s.

=== 1959: Tiong Bahru fire ===
On 13 February 1959, shortly after 1pm, a major fire broke out in Tiong Bahru, causing up to 12,000 people to lose their homes, about 1,000 attap huts and $2 million worth of damage. The cause of the fire was thought to be children playing with fireworks in a shop dealing with paper bags. Lack of fire lanes among the closely built huts and fire hydrants with low water pressure, due to a pending decision on a main road to be built through the area, hampered fire fighting efforts. Chief Minister Lim Yew Hock and mayor Ong Eng Guan were among those who helped with the fire fighting. There was one dead and four children missing. The Lee Foundation, directors of the Straits Times Press Ltd, Shaw Foundation, Singapore Glass Manufacturers Co. Ltd (whose factory is near the site of fire and a number of workers who lived near the factory lost their homes) donated to a relief fund for those affected by the fire.

Residents affected by the fire were moved into SIT's new flats in Kallang. William Tan, the Assemblyman for Tiong Bahru Constituency, said that representatives of the displaced residents requested to rebuild their houses on the fire site, subjected to the Ministry for Local Government, Lands and Housing's requirements for new developments, such as zinc roofs and fire lanes.

=== 2003: Tiong Bahru Conservation Area ===
In 2003, as a result of many years of discussion over the estate's heritage status as a pioneering experiment in modern urban housing and in its entrenched familiarity in Singaporeans' sense of place, twenty blocks of the pre-WWII flats were gazetted by the Urban Redevelopment Authority for conservation. Included in the Tiong Bahru Conservation Area are 36 units of shop houses on Outram Road.

In the early 2010s, older businesses such as hair salons and textile shops closed down with cafes, bakeries and artisanal shops opened up. Independent bookstore BooksActually moved to Tiong Bahru in 2011 but closed in the 2020 due to the COVID-19 pandemic in Singapore Specialty coffee cafe Forty Hands opened in 2010 and closed in 2022. Residents who often lived above the shops would face noise issues, resulting food and beverage shops to reduce or remove outdoor dining, closing the doors to reduce the noise or closing earlier.

In the 2020s, cafes and book stores started closing and replaced by gyms, clinics and art galleries, resulting in lesser tourists and locals. Residents welcomed the more quiet atmosphere.

=== 2025: Home Improvement Programme ===
In 2025, two HDB blocks, out of 29, in Tiong Bahru failed to get enough votes for Home Improvement Programme (HIP), a Housing and Development Board's house improvement programme, to proceed. As the two blocks of four-storey walk-up flats, previously built by the SIT, had only 15 and 24 households, the 11 and 16 votes were not enough to pass the threshold for HIP to proceed. A preliminary poll conducted in 2019 that 10 blocks out of the 29 would fail the 75 percent threshold and hence no poll was conducted. Another preliminary poll conducted in early 2025 indicated all 29 blocks would pass the threshold and the HIP poll was conducted.

Observers said a re-poll of the HIP could raise questions on the scheme. Institute of Policy Studies deputy director and senior research fellow Christopher Gee said "If it is done in a heavy-handed way – re-poll until you get the result you want – it sends a wrong signal to everyone looking at this as a fair exercise." Singapore Management University law don Eugene Tan noted that a second poll soon after an initial unfavourable result could undermine the integrity of the voting process and "raises the fair question of the legitimacy of the entire polling process for upgrading works in HDB precincts". Tan also noted that a re-poll currently worked only to gain support for upgrading and not while the poll is successful. Dr Walter Theseira, an associate professor of economics at the Singapore University of Social Sciences, said the allowance of a re-poll concerns policy consistency and fairness. Professor Sing Tien Foo, provost’s chair professor of real estate at NUS Business School, said a re-poll could be conducted if the poll results was close and to respect the results if the vote failed by a big margin. In general, observers said residents should not be pressured into voting to support the HIP.

On 4 December, Tanjong Pagar Group Representation Constituency Member of Parliament Foo Cexiang, who oversees Tiong Bahru, said he would ask for a re-poll if there were sufficient support and would speak to households who did not vote for the HIP works.

In October 2026, the two blocks, which did not attained enough votes for the HIP, went through a repoll and successfully gathered the required votes for the HIP.

== Design of the SIT Flats ==
The architect for the pre-war flats was Alfred G. Church, a Briton appointed by the colonial government. Block 55, the first block of 20 blocks was done by 1936. Built in the late Art Deco movement, the flats featured a style known as the Streamline Moderne. This style incorporated curved horizontal lines that embodied the machine age of automobiles. As a result, many settlers regarded the buildings as 'fei ji lou', or aeroplane flats in Chinese. Other architectural features include the use of masonry from the Alexandra Brickworks Company.

Built between 1948 and 1954, the design of the post-war flats was done by the SIT senior architect and the first locally appointed assistant architect. This featured an International Style with boxier, cleaner lines and modern materials such as steel, glass and concrete. In addition, the design was the first time the climate was taken into consideration as it include tropical elements such as higher ceilings, large windows, and balconies.

== Facilities ==
The estate has one shopping centre, the Tiong Bahru Plaza. Other facilities include a community centre opened in 1948; the 3.3 hectare Tiong Bahru Park; and Zhangde primary school. Alexandra Primary School and Singapore General Hospital are nearby. A number of cafes, restaurants and boutique shops cater to western Ex-Pats and Singaporean hipsters. These complement the traditional Kopitiams and Hainanese restaurants.

The Qi Tian Gong Temple at Eng Hoon Street is dedicated to the Monkey God. The temple will organised grand Birthday Celebrations on the 16th day of the 1st and 8th Lunar Months, which include lion, dragon dances, and performances of Chinese street opera. There is another Chinese temple that located along Kim Tian Road, Kim Lan Beo Temple (金兰庙) was founded in 1830 at Tanjong Pagar and was relocated to Kim Tian Road in 1988.

=== Tiong Bahru Market ===
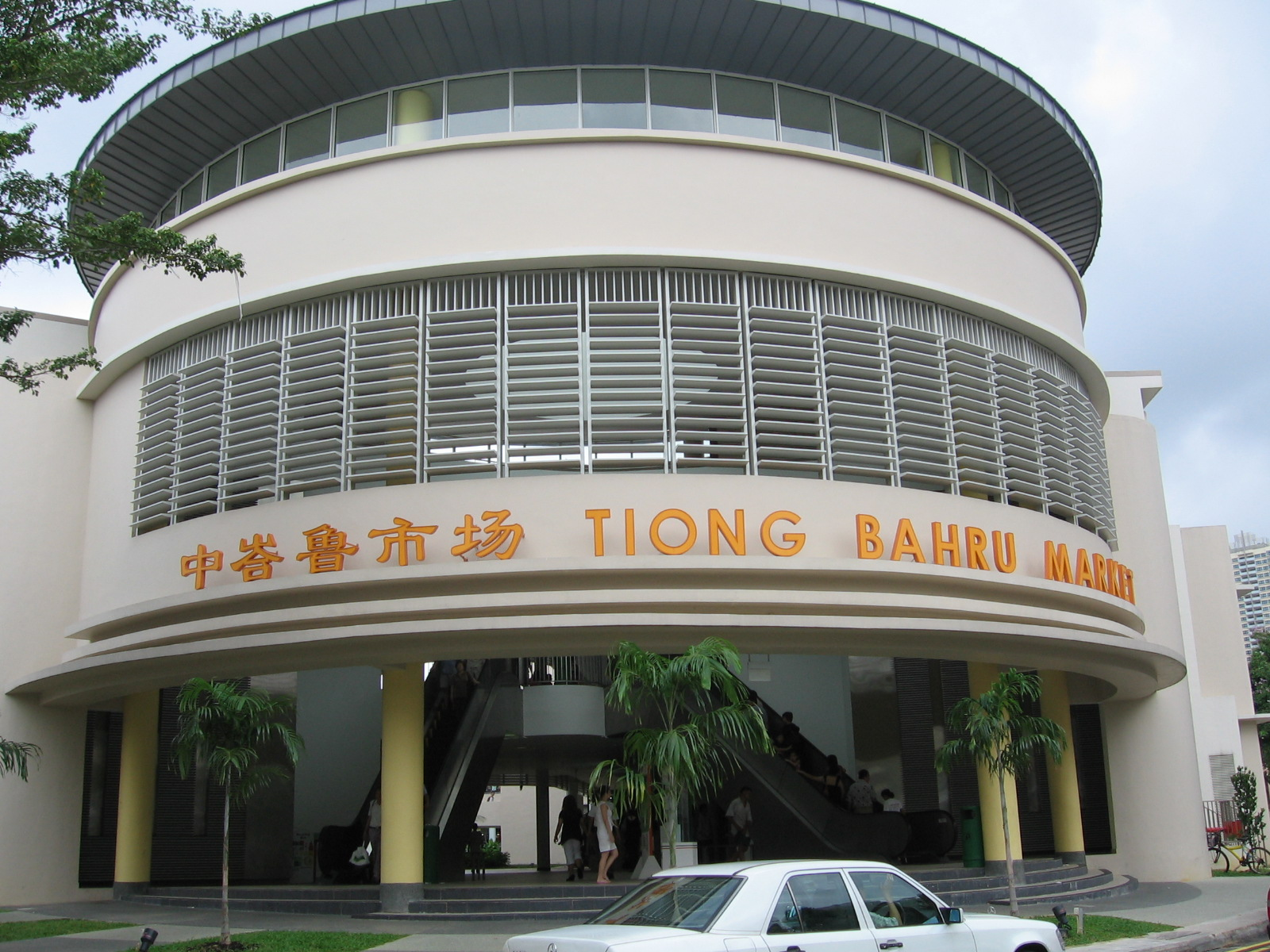
Tiong Bahru market, completed in May 2006

In 1945, two house shops were sacrificed to build a wet market on the Tiong Poh Road. The market was named after the Hokkien merchant and shipping magnate, Khoo Tiong Poh (1830 – 1892). However, the space in the market was too small to accommodate all the hawkers who desired a space.

In 1955, the Tiong Bahru Market (Seng Poh Market) was constructed under the auspices of the National Environment Agency after some hawkers moved to an open area on Seng Poh Road.

The market was constructed of stalls with a simple wooden frame and zinc-pitched roofs. Meats were hung without refrigeration. The Tiong Bahru market catered to the residents of the Tiong Bahru, Bukit Merah and Henderson estates. Heritage street foods such as lor mee, chwee kueh, Hokkien mee, pao, porridge, and roast pork were available in the market as well as a diverse number of goods for sale from textiles to flowers and many besides. Bartering for the best price was common.

In 1993 and 2004, improvements were made to the market including a watertight roof, brighter lights, a broader walkway and garden lights. In 2004, the market was closed for two years for rebuilding. Stall holders were relocated to a temporary site on Kim Pong Road during this time. In 2006, the new market opened. It was a concrete two storey structure with a wet market and retail stalls on the ground floor and upstairs, an area for hawkers. It remains a place of community heritage. There are tours of the market, surrounding blocks of flats and the nearby World War II air raid shelters. In 2012, the National Heritage Board created an exhibition near the Tiong Bahru market to commemorate the battle for Singapore.

== Transportation ==
Tiong Bahru is served by two Mass Rapid Transit stations, the namesake Tiong Bahru MRT station of the East West line and Havelock MRT station of the Thomson-East Coast line, which is more accessible from some parts of Tiong Bahru. Nearby bus stations include Bukit Merah Bus Interchange and Kampong Bahru Bus Terminal, which is connected to by various bus services that ply Tiong Bahru Road and Jalan Bukit Merah.

== Politics ==
The Tiong Bahru Constituency was formed in 1955 with William Tan, from the Democratic Party, as its first representative at the Legislative Assembly of Singapore. Lee Teck Him, of the People's Action Party, would win the contest for Tiong Bahru Constituency in the 1959 Singaporean general election. Tiong Bahru would remains in PAP's control from 1959 till present day.

In 1988, the constituency was abolished following the establishment of Group representation constituency (GRC) and Single Member Constituency (SMC). Tiong Bahru Constituency was merged with Henderso and Radin Mas Constituencies to form the Tiong Bahru GRC. S Vasoo, of the PAP, was the MP who was in charge of the Tiong Bahru division of the GRC.

In 1991, Tanjong Pagar GRC was created prior to the 1991 general election from Tiong Bahru GRC and Telok Blangah and Tanjong Pagar SMCs. It was assigned four MPs, as with all GRCs at that election. Koo Tsai Kee, of the PAP, was the MP who was in charge of the Tiong Bahru division of the GRC.

Ahead of the 2011 election, Koo retired from politics. The PAP won the electoral contest for Tanjong Pagar GRC with Lee Kuan Yew taking over the merged division of Tanjong Pagar-Tiong Bahru from Tanjong Pagar and Tiong Bahru divisions.

From 2015 to 2025, Indranee Rajah took over the Tanjong Pagar-Tiong Bahru division as the GRC remained in PAP's control. During the 2025 Singaporean general election, Indranee was moved to contest Pasir Ris–Changi GRC. The PAP team continued to win in the 2025 elections for Tanjong Pagar GRC, Foo Cexiang, of the PAP team, took charge of the Tanjong Pagar-Tiong Bahru division.

== Notable places ==
- Tiong Bahru Air Raid Shelter, a former air raid shelter and museum.
- 78 Moh Guan Terrace, conserved Singapore Improvement Trust building.

== In media ==
- The television drama series 118, 118 II and 118 Reunion are set around a traditional kopitiam in Tiong Bahru.
- Tiong Bahru Social Club, 2020 Singaporean satirical black comedy art film.
- In 2010, the estate and its residents were the subject of the Civic Life films by Irish filmmakers, Joe Lawlor and Christine Molloy. Titled Tiong Bahru, it was also part of the Civic Life: Singapore, an art project. 150 volunteers from the estate and Singapore were involved. The film premiered at the National Museum of Singapore in October 2010.
