= Back lane =

Rear access or service road

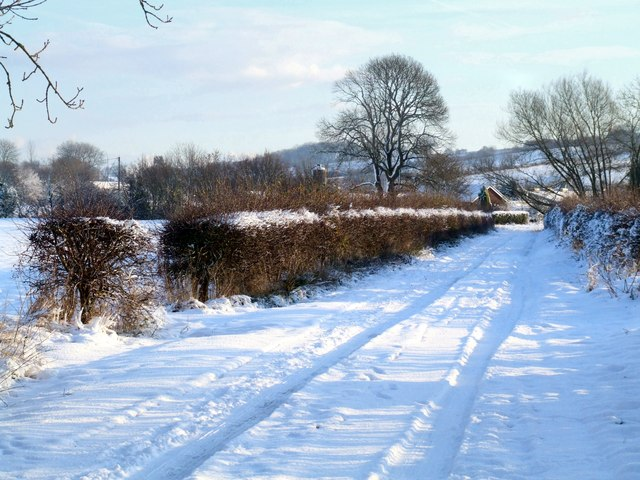
Back Lane, Old Bolingbroke

A back lane, laneway, alley or back alley is a service or access road behind houses or, in a commercial district, which was created for deliveries and parking, amongst other things. In American "service alley rights-of-way are typically 16 feet–24 feet wide, measured from property line to property line". The name frequently survives as a street name in a much enlarged urban settlement (there is an example in Wheldrake), but it is common for the back lane to be reduced to a narrow pathway.

Back lanes were often found in a planned medieval village running parallel to the main street at the other end of burgage plots. There may be a back lane on each side of the main street which, together with the main street itself, provides a rectangular framework for the development of the village. Although the burgage plot was used for small-scale activities such as livestock or orchards, the back lane frequently divided the village from the main agricultural area such as the open fields.
