= Kampong Tiong Bahru =

- Subzone of Bukit Merah Planning Area

Other transcription(s)
  - Chinese: 甘榜中峇鲁
  - Malay: Kampung Tiong Bahru
  - Jawi: كامڤوڠ تيوڠ بهرو
- Interactive map of Kampong Tiong Bahru
- Country: Singapore
- Region: Central Region
- Planning Area: Bukit Merah

Kampong Tiong Bahru (Chinese: 甘榜中峇鲁) is a subzone within the planning area of Bukit Merah, Singapore, as defined by the Urban Redevelopment Authority (URA). Its boundary is made up of the Ayer Rajah Expressway (AYE) in the south; Kampong Bahru Road in the east; Jalan Bukit Merah in the north; and Lower Delta Road in the west.
