= Nature reserves in Singapore =

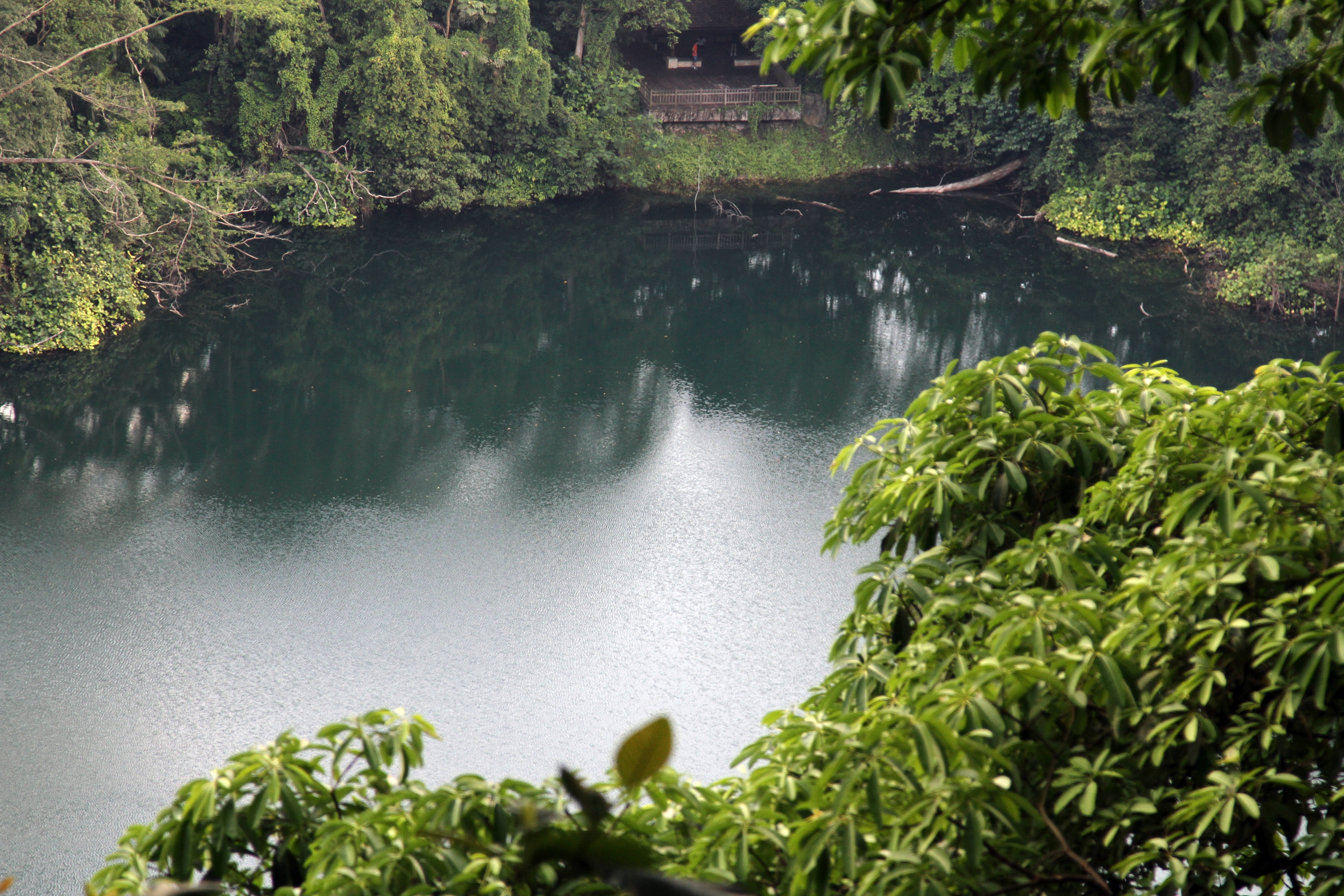
Quarry visible from the Bukit Timah Nature Reserve, photographed in June 2013

The Singaporean government has established four nature reserves in Singapore. They are the Bukit Timah Nature Reserve, Central Catchment Nature Reserve, Labrador Nature Reserve, and Sungei Buloh Wetland Reserve.

== History ==
One of the first notions of nature reserves in Singapore was thought up by the then-Singapore Botanical Gardens Superintendent N. C. Cantley who, in 1882, proposed that select areas of land be preserved. In as early as 1883, the Bukit Timah Nature Reserve (as it is now known) was established, making it the inaugural nature reserve in Singapore. The Singapore Nature Reserves Act officially came into action in 1971. In 1984, nature reserves took up some 2,000 hectares (4,900 acres) of the country's land. This figure has been increased to 3,000 hectares (7,400 acres), as of 2009.

== Biosphere reserves ==
The Public Utilities Board-maintained Central Catchment Nature Reserve is Singapore's largest nature reserve. The Sungei Buloh Wetland Reserve aids in the conservation of both bird species and mangrove plants. The Bukit Timah Nature Reserve, albeit small-sized at 164 hectares (410 acres), hosts myriad plant and animal lifeforms. Chek Jawa is situated in eastern Pulau Ubin.The Labrador Nature Reserve is located by the sea. Described as "an oasis of tranquility and natural wonders", it teems with vast animal life, as well as plant life by the cliff. The 131 hectares (320 acres) large Sungei Buloh Wetland Reserve comprises mostly wetland and a few bird species, most notably the shorebird, can be spotted there. It is cited as the "first wetlands reserve to be gazetted in Singapore".

== Issues ==
Owing to rapid urban development, the country is in need of more land for things such as housing, which is deemed more important than nature reservation. One possible issue faced by the biosphere reserves in Singapore is that they will be turned into nothingness by the government when the need arises. There was an instance when the government had wanted to reclaim part of Chek Jawa, but this was opposed by conservationists and it was ultimately not reclaimed.

== Gallery ==
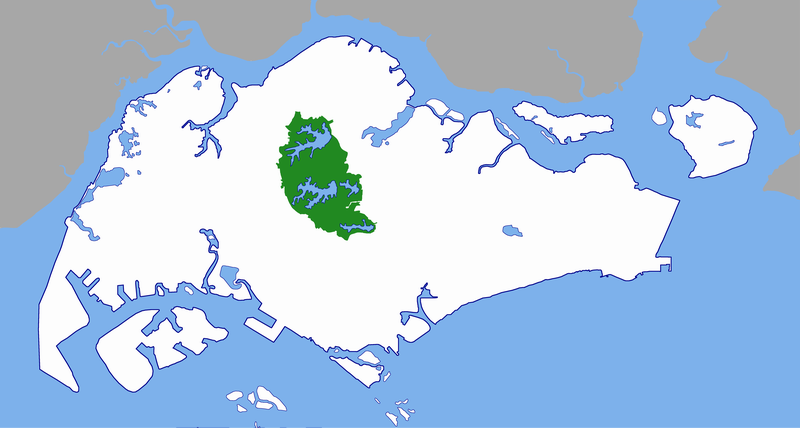
Central Catchment Nature Reserve

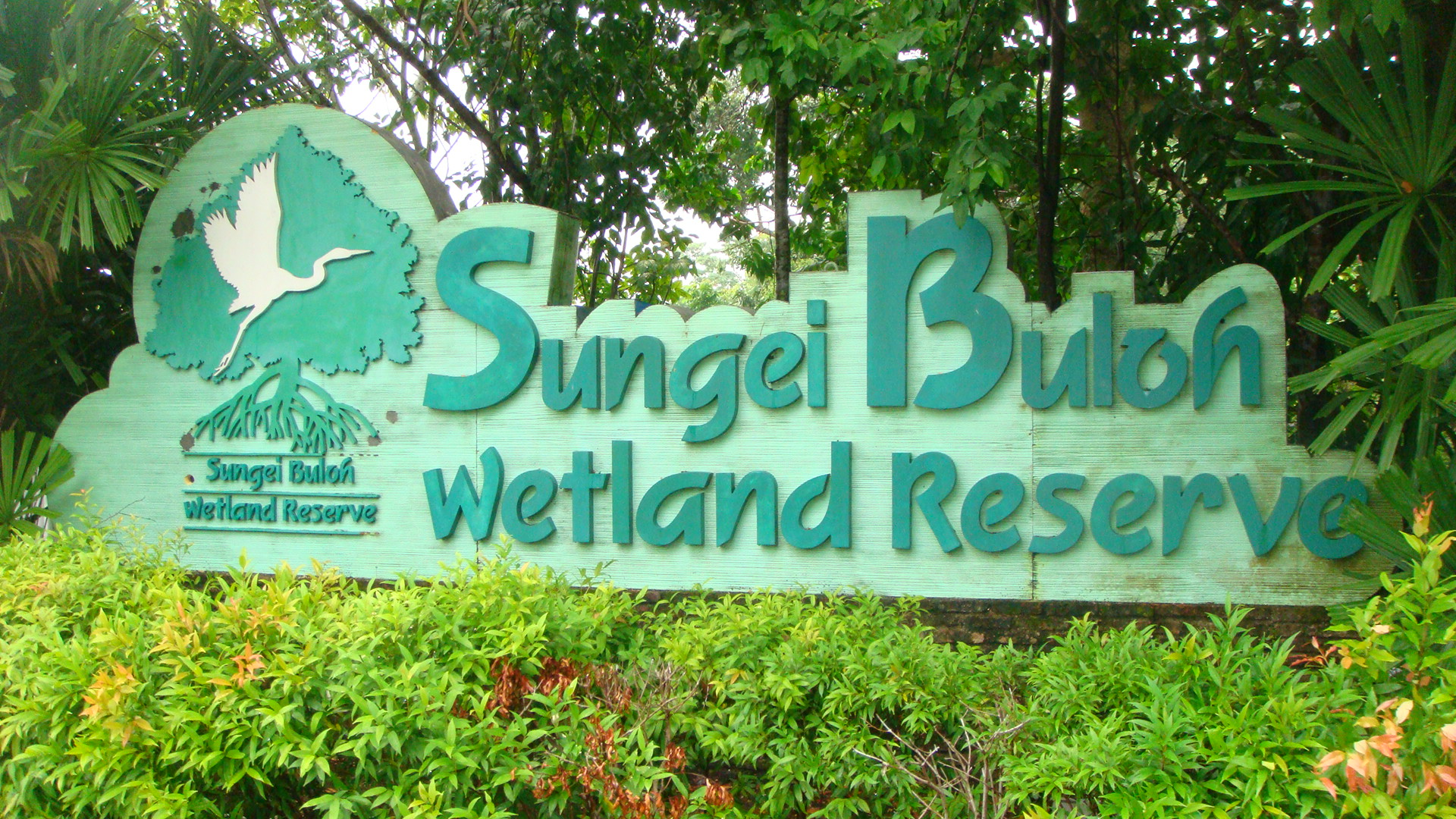
Signage of Sungei Buloh Wetland Reserve

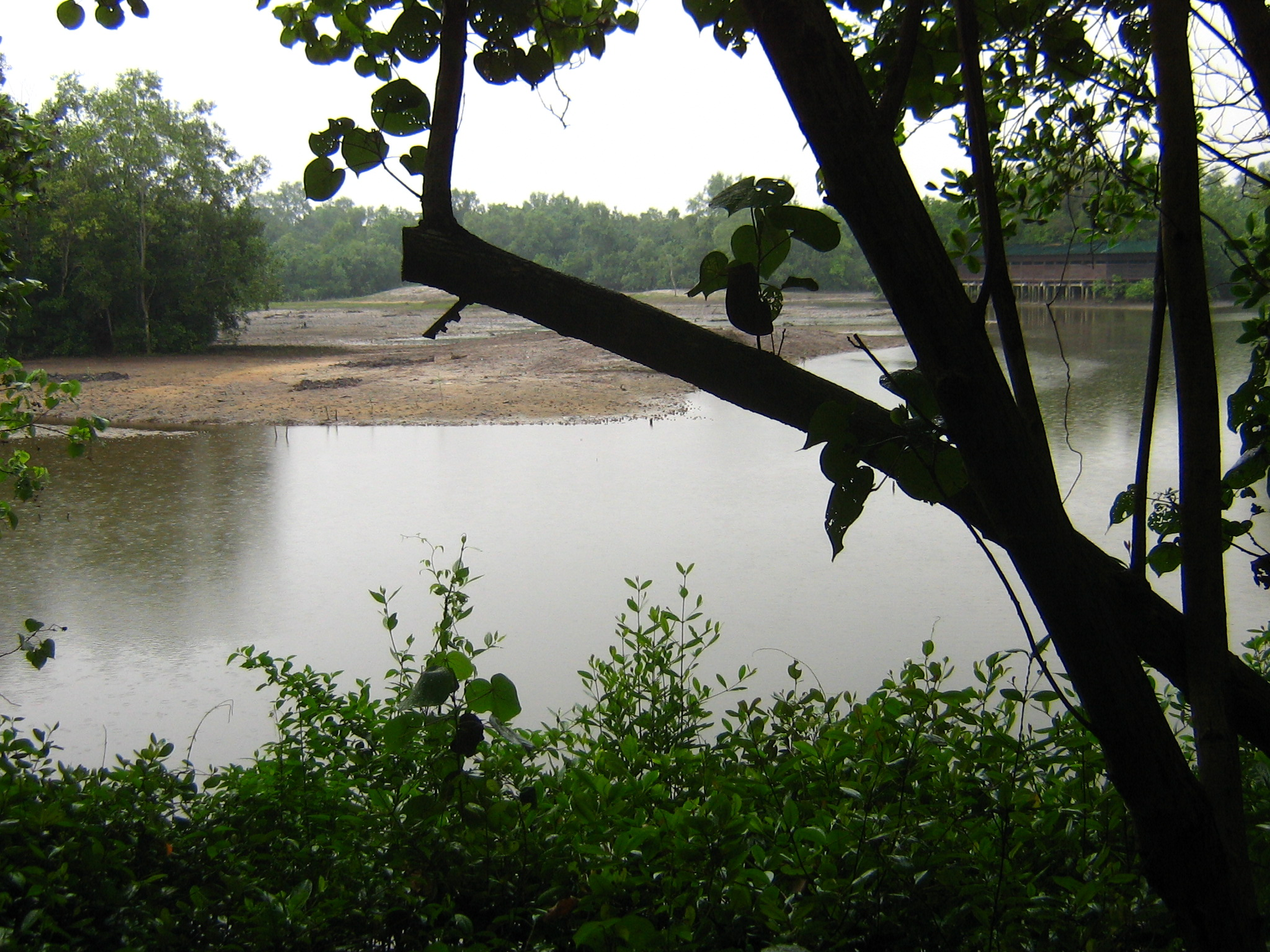
The wetlands of Sungei Buloh Wetland Reserve

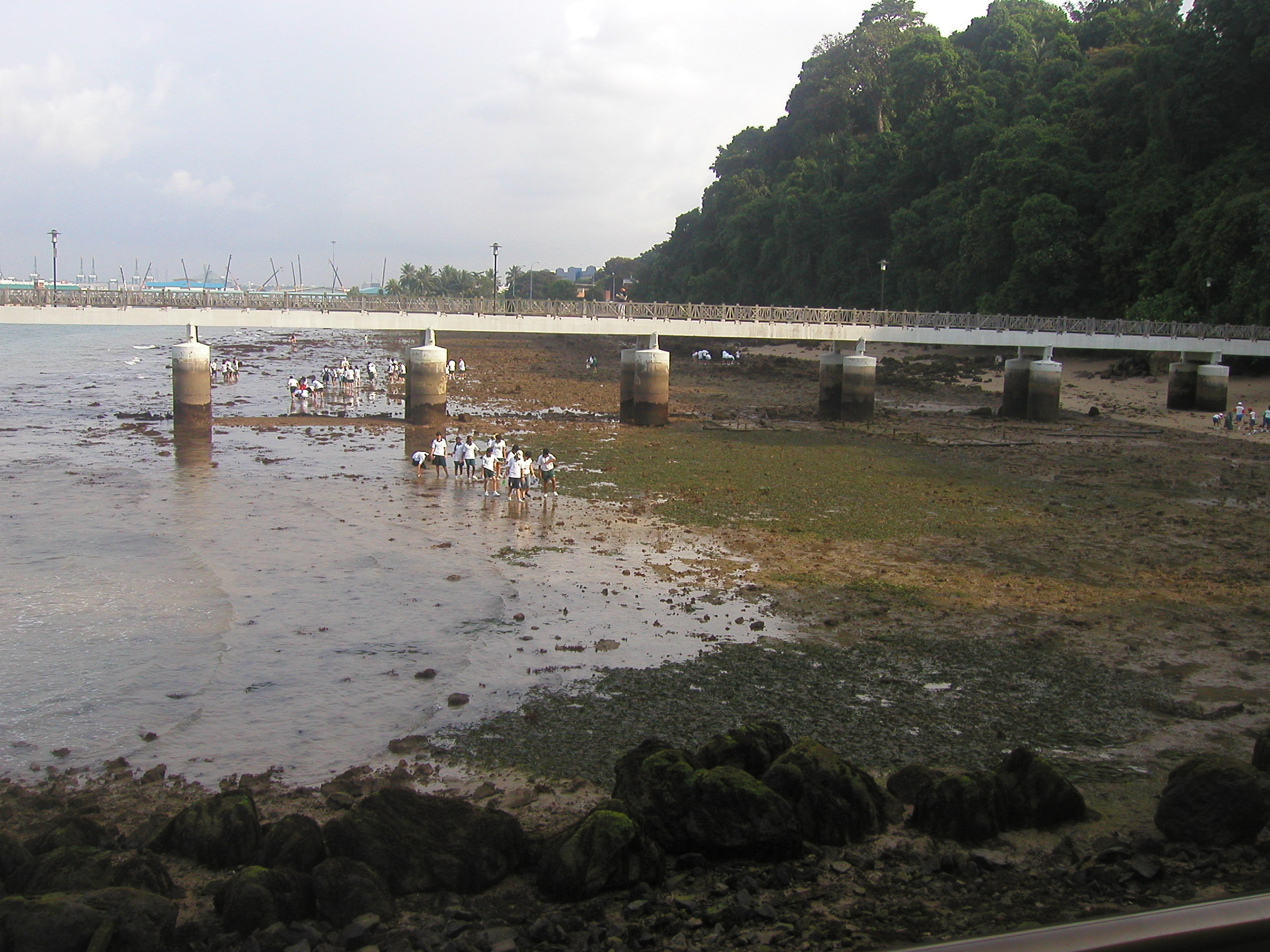
Labrador Nature Reserve during low tide

== See also ==
- Protected areas of Singapore
