= List of parks in Singapore =

Parks of Singapore
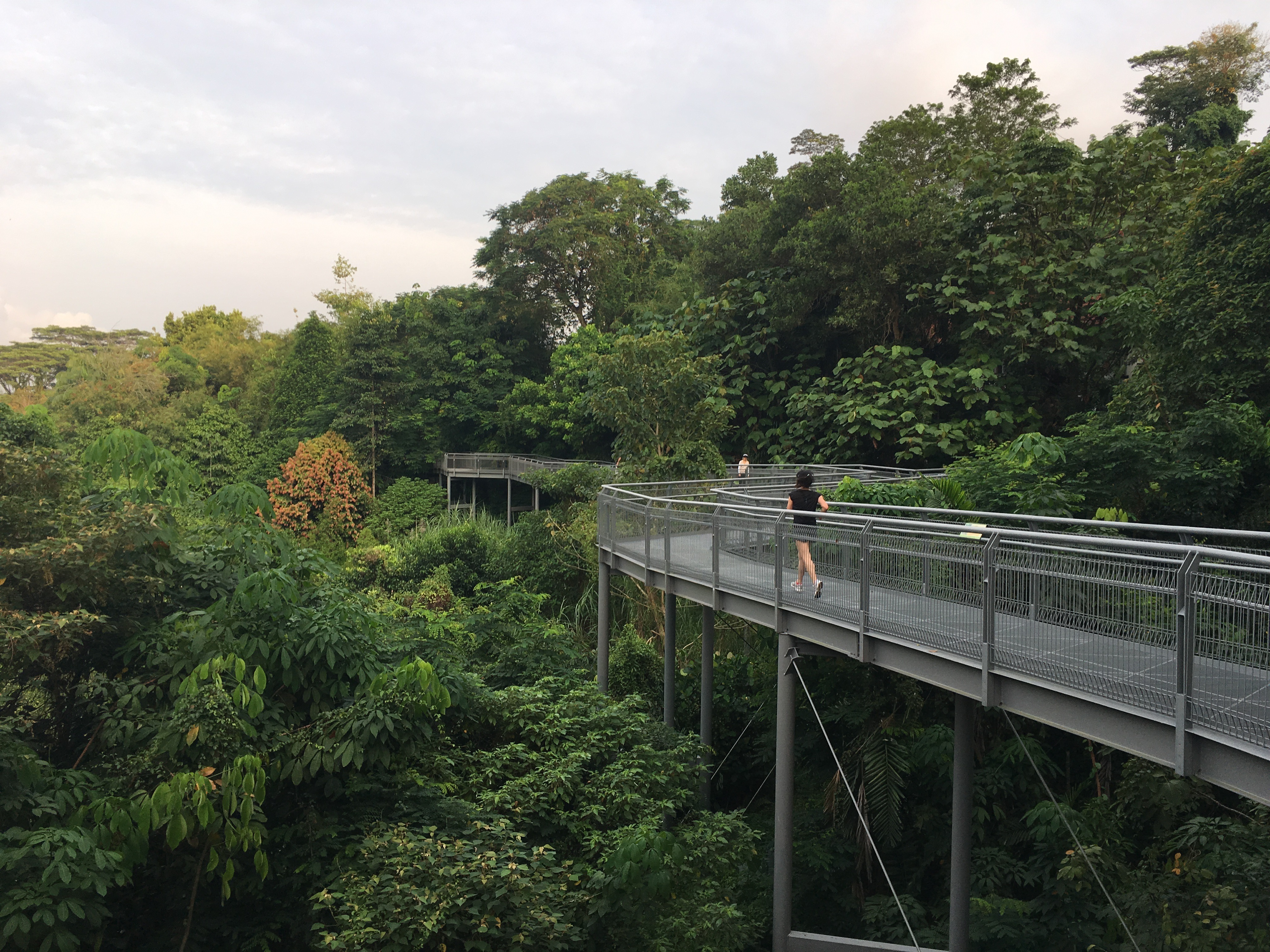
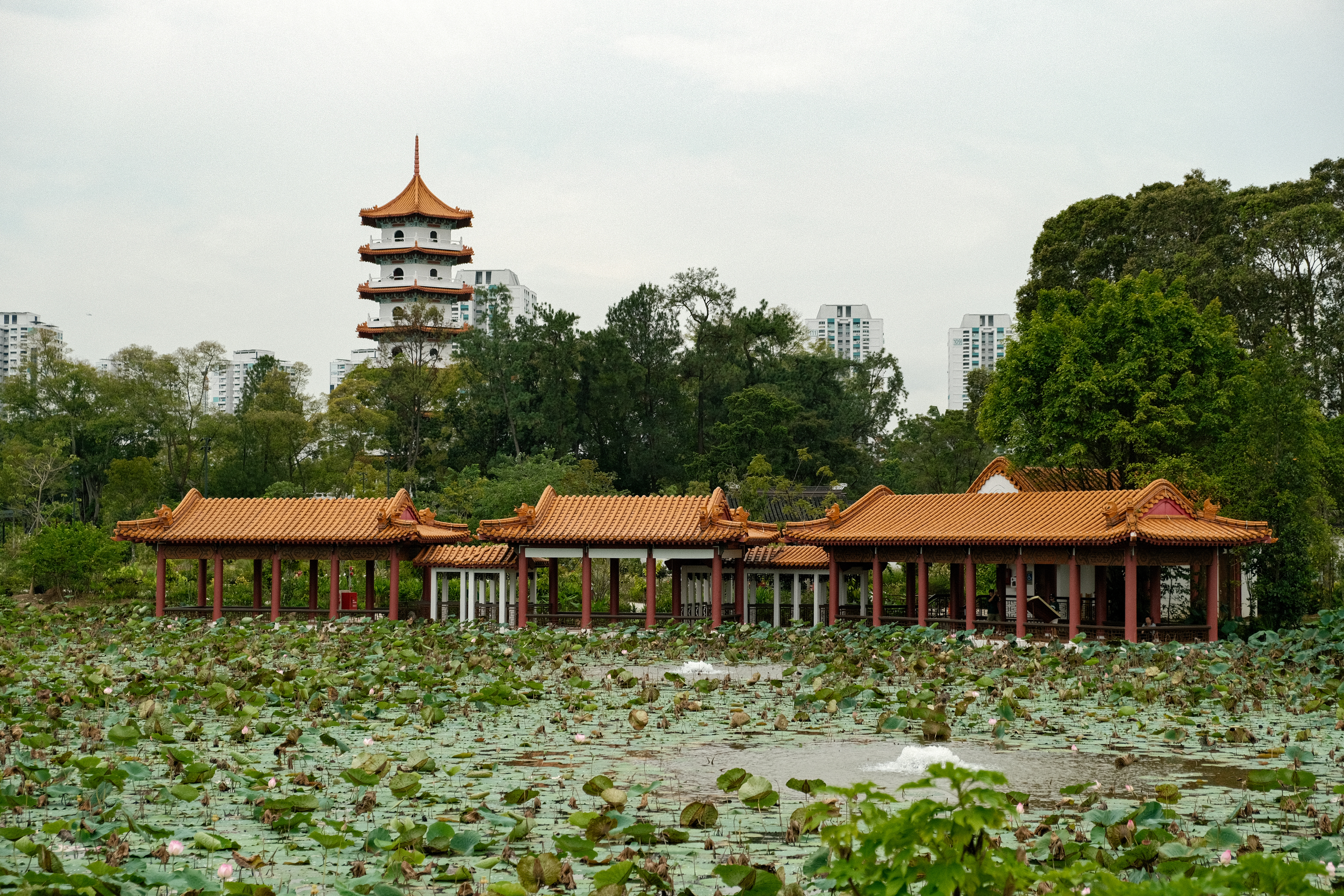
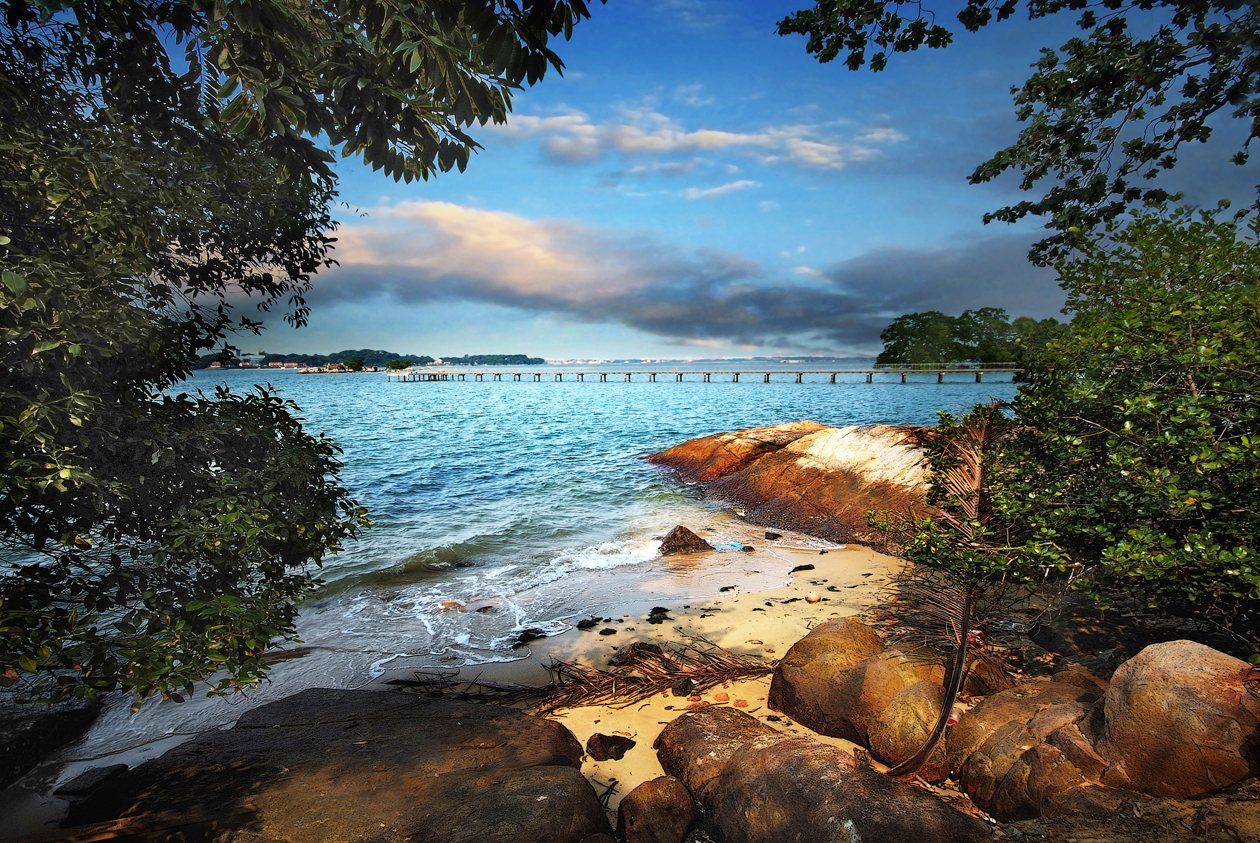
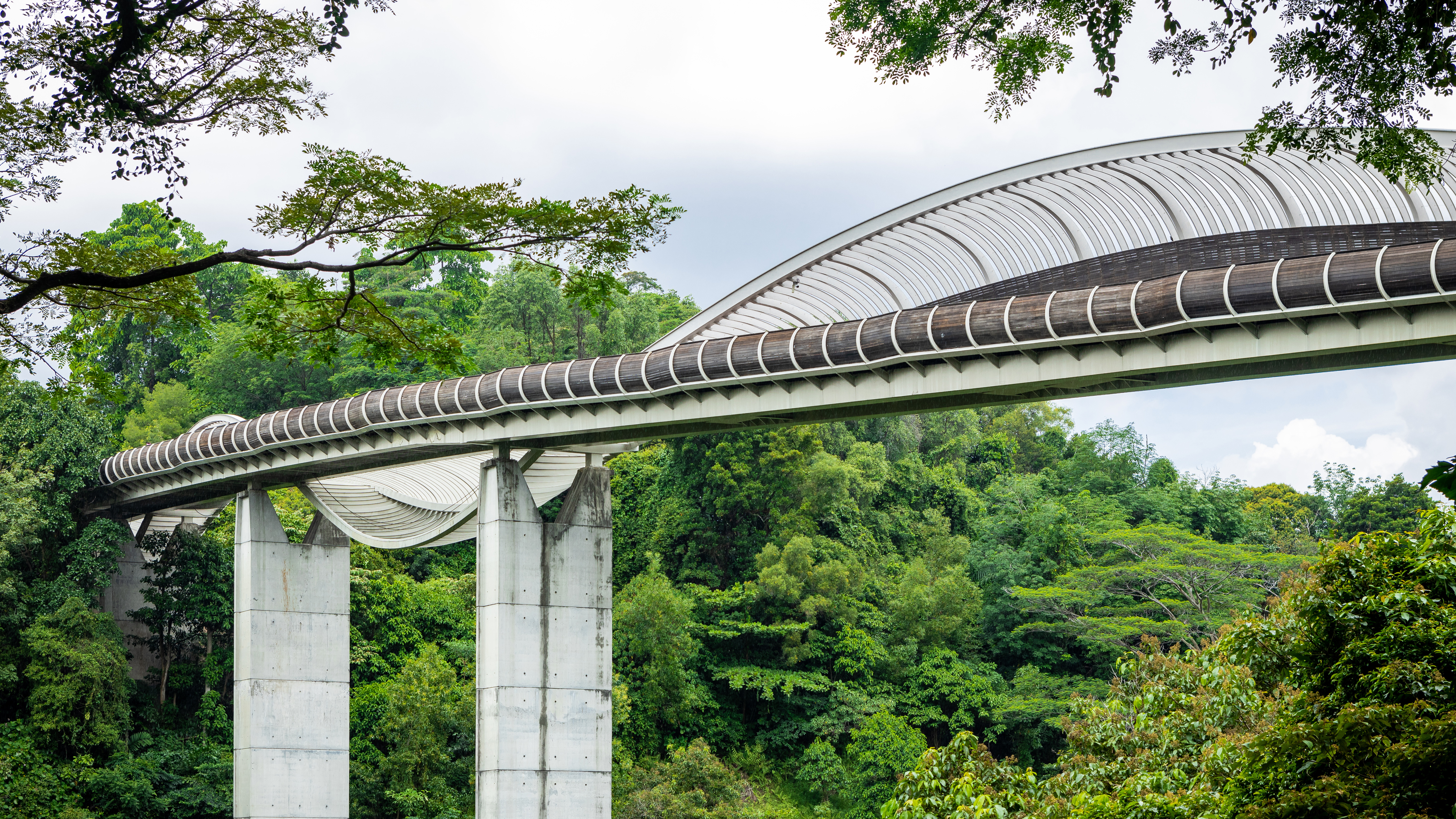
- From top left to right: Forest Walk at Southern Ridges, Pagodas at Chinese Garden, Chek Jawa at Pulau Ubin and Henderson Waves
- Location: Various locations around Singapore
- Use: Recreational
- Sights: Flowering plants, Secondary forests

There are numerous parks throughout the sovereign island country of Singapore. This is a list of parks in Singapore that currently exist and have articles on Wikipedia. Under the National Parks Board Act 1996, the National Parks Board (NParks) maintains public parks, nature reserves, and national parks. Most of these parks are connected via the Park Connector Network (PCN) walking/running/cycling paths.

Name	Type	Area (m$^2$)	Area (sq ft)
Admiralty Park	Nature	270,000	2,900,000
Ang Mo Kio Town Garden East	Community	49,000	530,000
Ang Mo Kio Town Garden West	Community	206,000	2,220,000
Bedok Town Park	Community	146,000	1,570,000
Bishan-Ang Mo Kio Park	Community	620,000	6,700,000
Bukit Batok Nature Park	Nature	357,000	3,840,000
Bukit Batok Town Park	Nature	422,000	4,540,000
Bukit Timah Nature Reserve	Nature reserve	1,640,000	17,700,000
Central Catchment Nature Reserve	Nature reserve	28,800,000	310,000,000
Changi Beach Park	Coastal	311,000	3,350,000
Chek Jawa	Offshore islands	1,000,000	11,000,000
Chinese Garden	Jurong Lake Gardens	135,000	1,450,000
Choa Chu Kang Park	Community	50,000	540,000
Clementi Woods Park	Community	117,000	1,260,000
Coney Island Park	Offshore islands	500,000	5,400,000
Dairy Farm Nature Park	Nature	630,000	6,800,000
Dhoby Ghaut Green	Arts and heritage	11,144	119,950
East Coast Park	Coastal	1,860,000	20,000,000
Esplanade Park	Arts and heritage	24,000	260,000
Fort Canning Park	Arts and heritage	179,000	1,930,000
Gardens by the Bay	Arts and heritage	940,000	10,100,000
Hindhede Nature Park	Nature	95,000	1,020,000
Hong Lim Park	Arts and heritage	9,400	101,000
HortPark - The Gardening Hub	HortPark and Southern Ridges	23,000	250,000
Istana Park	Arts and heritage	13,000	140,000
Japanese Cemetery Park	Community	29,359	316,020
Japanese Garden	Jurong Lake Gardens	135,000	1,450,000
Jurong Central Park	Community	80,000	860,000
Jurong Lake Gardens	Regional	860,000	9,300,000
Kallang Riverside Park	Riverine	48,000	520,000
Kent Ridge Park	HortPark and Southern Ridges	465,000	5,010,000
Ketam Mountain Bike Park	Community	450,000	4,800,000
Kranji Marshes	Nature reserve	540,000	5,800,000
Kranji Reservoir Park	Riverine	90,000	970,000
Labrador Nature Reserve	Nature reserve	220,000	2,400,000
Labrador Park	Coastal	120,000	1,300,000
Lower Seletar Reservoir Park	Riverine	33,000	360,000
MacRitchie Reservoir Park	Riverine	120,000	1,300,000
Marsiling Park	Community	110,000	1,200,000
Mount Emily Park, Singapore	Community	31,000	330,000
Mount Faber Park	HortPark and Southern Ridges	565,000	6,080,000
National Orchid Garden	Singapore Botanic Gardens	30,000	320,000
One-north Park	Community	33,000	360,000
Pasir Ris Park	Coastal	705,000	7,590,000
Pasir Ris Town Park	Community	140,000	1,500,000
Pearl's Hill City Park	Arts and heritage	90,000	970,000
Pulau Ubin	Offshore islands	10,200,000	110,000,000
Punggol Park	Community	163,000	1,750,000
Punggol Point Park	Community	163,000	1,750,000
Punggol Waterway Park	Riverine	122,500	1,319,000
Raffles Place Park	Arts and heritage	6,000	65,000
Rifle Range Nature Park	Nature	660,000	7,100,000
Sembawang Park	Coastal	155,000	1,670,000
Sengkang Riverside Park	Riverine	210,000	2,300,000
Sengkang Sculpture Park	Community	?	?
Singapore Botanic Gardens	Singapore Botanic Gardens	630,000	6,800,000
Sisters' Island Marine Park	Marine	400,000	4,300,000
Sun Plaza Park	Community	96,000	1,030,000
Sungei Buloh Wetland Reserve	Nature reserve	1,300,000	14,000,000
Tampines Eco Green	Community	360,000	3,900,000
Tanjong Pagar Park	Arts and heritage	10,200	110,000
Telok Blangah Hill Park	HortPark and Southern Ridges	345,000	3,710,000
The Southern Ridges	HortPark and Southern Ridges	9,000	97,000
Tiong Bahru Park	Arts and heritage	30,000	320,000
Toa Payoh Town Park	Community	48,000	520,000
Upper Peirce Reservoir Park	Riverine	50,000	540,000
Upper Seletar Reservoir	Riverine	15,000	160,000
War Memorial Park	Arts and heritage	16,000	170,000
Waterboat House Garden	Arts and heritage	7,380	79,400
West Coast Park	Coastal	500,000	5,400,000
Woodlands Waterfront Park	Community	110,000	1,200,000
Yishun Neighbourhood Park	Community	77,000	830,000
Yishun Park	Nature	139,000	1,500,000
Yishun Pond Park	Riverine	23,000	250,000
Youth Olympic Park	Arts and heritage	4,000	43,000
Zhenghua Park	Nature	135,000	1,450,000
Duxton Plain Park	Arts and heritage	50,000	540,000

== See also ==
- Park Connector Network (PCN)
