= SBWR =

SBWR may refer to:

- Simplified Boiling Water Reactor, a nuclear reactor design by General Electric
- Sungei Buloh Wetland Reserve, a nature reserve in Singapore
