= Woodlands Waterfront Park =

Park in Singapore

- Interactive map of Woodlands Waterfront Park
- Type: River line park
- Coordinates: 1.4527°N 103.7786°E
- Operator: National Parks Board
- Status: Open
- Website: www.nparks.gov.sg/gardens-parks-and-nature/parks-and-nature-reserves/woodlands-waterfront-park

Woodlands Waterfront Park is a park located at Admiralty Road West in Woodlands, Singapore and overlooks the sea from the north. The 11-hectare (27-acre) park houses a large playground with a wide range of equipment and a 1.5-kilometre-long (0.93 mi) waterfront promenade. Central Spine and Green Lawn provides a spacious spots to hold events and picnics. Vantage points located along the trail gives visitors a panoramic view of the entire coastal park and the Straits of Johor. A 25 km (16 mi) Northern explorer loop connects Woodlands waterfront park to Admiralty Park along with other park connectors.

== History ==
The park was opened in 2010 at a cost of S$19 million.

== See also ==
- List of Parks in Singapore
