= Tanjong Pagar Park =

Park in Tanjong Pagar, Singapore

- Location within Singapore
- Type: Urban park
- Location: Tanjong Pagar, Singapore
- Coordinates: 1°16′35.5″N 103°50′48.0″E
- Area: 1.02 hectares (10,200 m^{2})
- Opened: 21 October 2005
- Manager: Guoco Tower
- Status: Open
- Public transit: EW15 Tanjong Pagar

Tanjong Pagar Park, formerly known as Tanjong Pagar RICOH Park, is an urban park situated around the Guoco Tower (formerly Tanjong Pagar Centre) in Singapore. The entire complex is located above Tanjong Pagar MRT station.

== History ==
Tanjong Pagar Park was originally launched on 21 October 2005 as a partnership between the National Parks Board and Ricoh Asia Pacific Pte Ltd, and was named Tanjong Pagar RICOH Park. The park also consisted of benches and seats installed under mature trees such as Cratoxylum formosum (Pink Mampat) and Pterocarpus indicus (Angsana). There were 17 of these benches the park which were donated by Ricoh, and were specially manufactured in Australia from recycled toner cartridges.

In 2013, the park was demolished and original site of the park was used to construct Tanjong Pagar Centre. In 2016, the park was reopened with a new look and landscape along with the Tanjong Pagar Centre, while a new park known as Urban Park was opened on top of this building.

== See also ==
- List of Parks in Singapore
- National Parks Board
