= Tampines Eco Green =

Park in Tampines, Singapore

- Interactive map of Tampines Eco Green
- Location: Tampines, Singapore
- Coordinates: 1.3638°N 103.9482°E
- Area: 36 hectares (360,000 m^{2})
- Opened: 24 April 2011; 15 years ago
- Manager: National Parks Board
- Status: Open

Tampines Eco Green is a park in Tampines, Singapore. It is bordered by Tampines Expressway, Tampines Avenue 12 and the Sungei Tampines canal. The park was opened to the public in April 2011.

The 36 hectares park consist of open grasslands, freshwater wetlands and a secondary rainforest and is linked by park connectors from Sun Plaza Park. The main activities include nature appreciation and bird-watching.

== See also ==
- List of parks in Singapore
- Tampines
- Tampines Expressway
