= Punggol Park =

Park in Hougang, Singapore

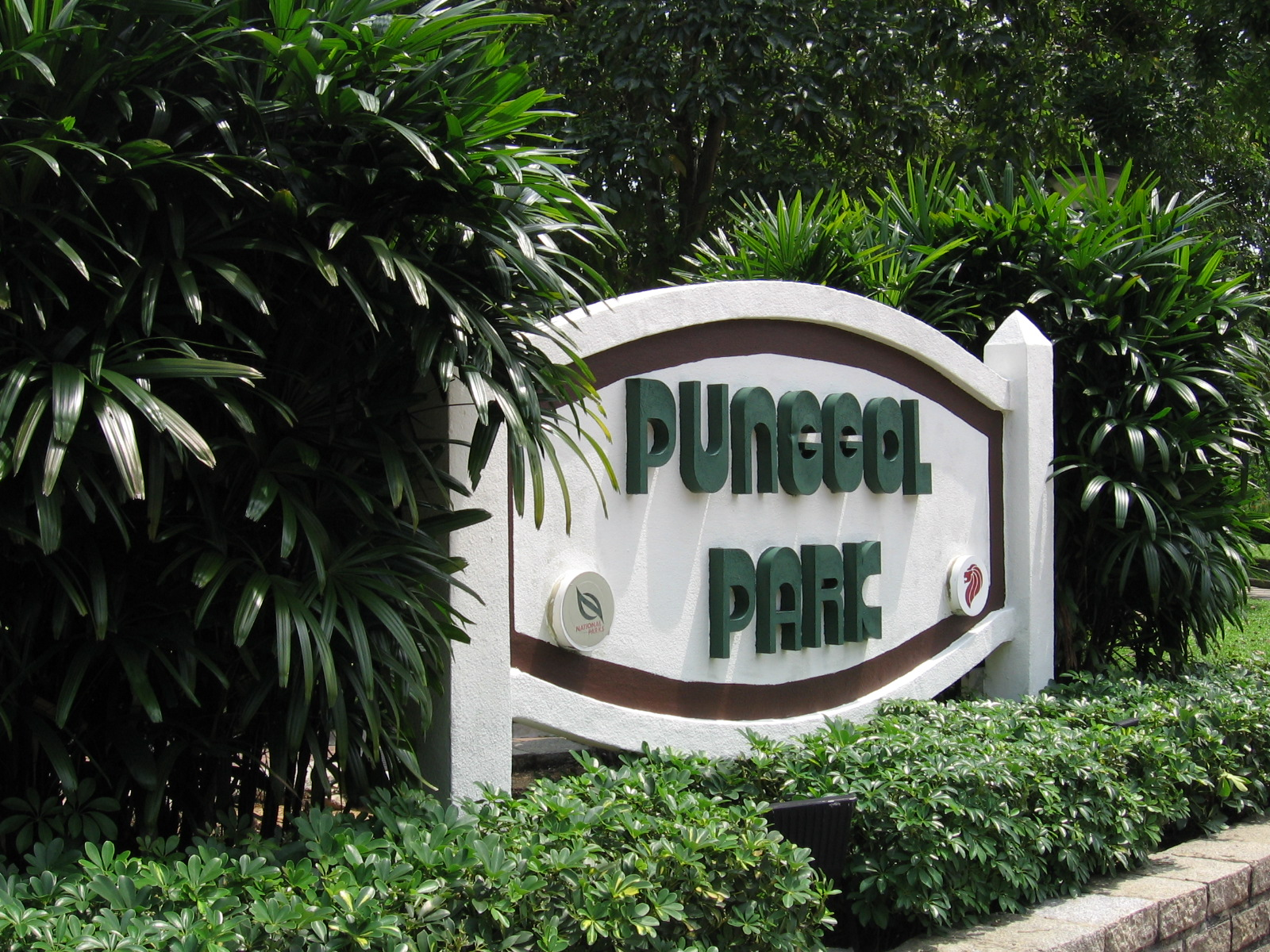
- Stone sign at Punggol Park
- Interactive map of Punggol Park
- Type: Neighbourhood park
- Location: Hougang, Singapore
- Coordinates: 1.3771523°N 103.897315°E
- Area: 16 hectares (40 acres)
- Operator: National Parks Board
- Status: Open
- Website: beta.nparks.gov.sg/visit/parks/park-detail/punggol-park/

Punggol Park (Chinese: 榜鹅公园) is a park located in Hougang, in the north-eastern part of Singapore. The park is 16 hectares (40 acres) in size, with a 5-hectare (12-acre) lake. Kite flying is not allowed here due to the proximity of Paya Lebar Air Base.

The park has two distinctive zones: the "Southern Active Zone" where the features for major activities are provided, and the densely forested area in the north of the lake which forms the "Passive Zone".

The plan for a park at Hougang was announced in November 1992. The park was named Punggol Park, and the junction of Hougang Avenue 8 and Hougang Avenue 10 was chosen as the location. The park is known for its pond and used frequently by schools for their 1.6 km (0.99 mi) runs. The pond was once quarried for sand to reclaim the many swamps in Hougang, thus resulting in the pond we have today.

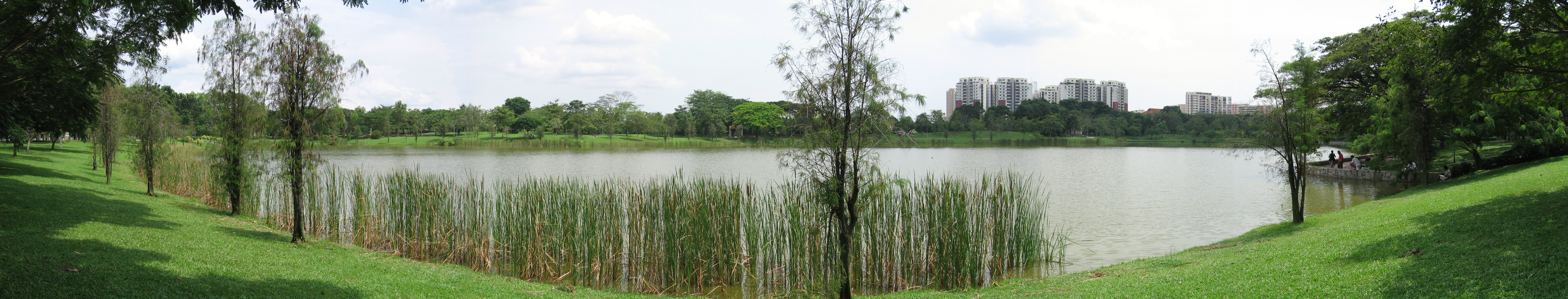
Lake at Punggol Park, Hougang, Singapore

== See also ==
- List of parks in Singapore
