= Marsiling (disambiguation) =

Marsiling is a suburb of Woodlands, Singapore.

Marsiling may also refer to:

- Marsiling Bus Terminal
- Marsiling MRT station, an Mass Rapid Transit (MRT) station in Woodlands, Singapore.
- Marsiling Park, a community park in Woodlands, Singapore
- Marsiling Primary School
- Marsiling Secondary School, a co-educational government secondary school in Marsiling, Singapore

== See also ==
- Marsile
- Marsiling–Yew Tee Group Representation Constituency
