= Yishun Neighbourhood Park =

Park located in Yishun, Singapore

- Interactive map of Yishun Neighbourhood Park
- Type: Urban park
- Location: Yishun, Singapore
- Coordinates: 1.4379°N 103.8331°E
- Area: 7.7 hectares (77,000 m^{2})
- Operator: National Parks Board
- Status: Open
- Website: www.nparks.gov.sg/gardens-parks-and-nature/parks-and-nature-reserves/yishun-neighbourhood-park

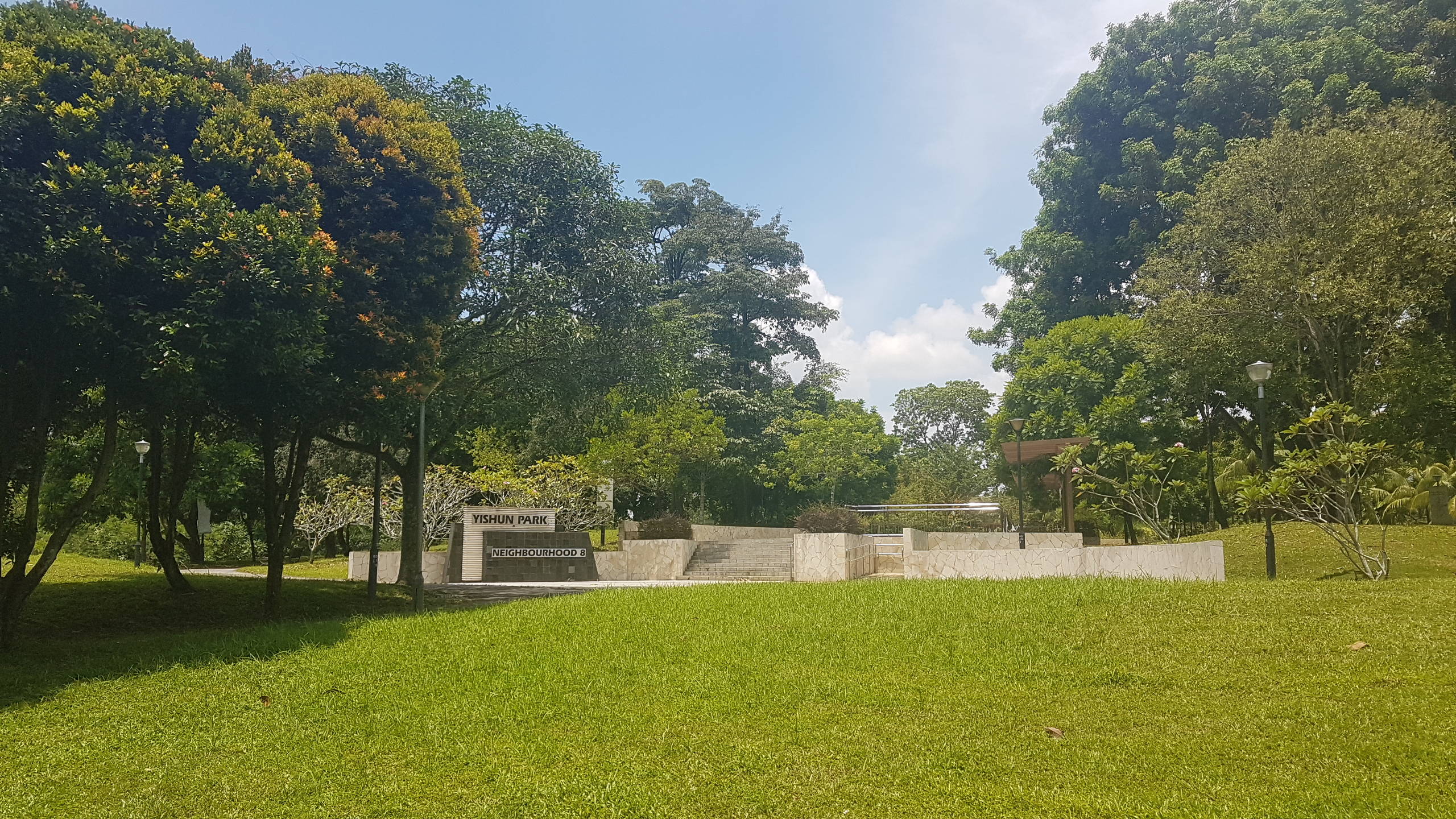
Yishun Park (Neighbourhood 8)

Yishun Neighbourhood Park is a park located in Yishun, Singapore. The 7.7 hectares park was developed on an old rubber estate and features a hill with an open lawn, ideal for picnics. Facilities include children's playground and fitness equipment.

== See also ==
- List of parks in Singapore
