= Park Connector Network =

Network of park/greenspace connecting paths in Singapore

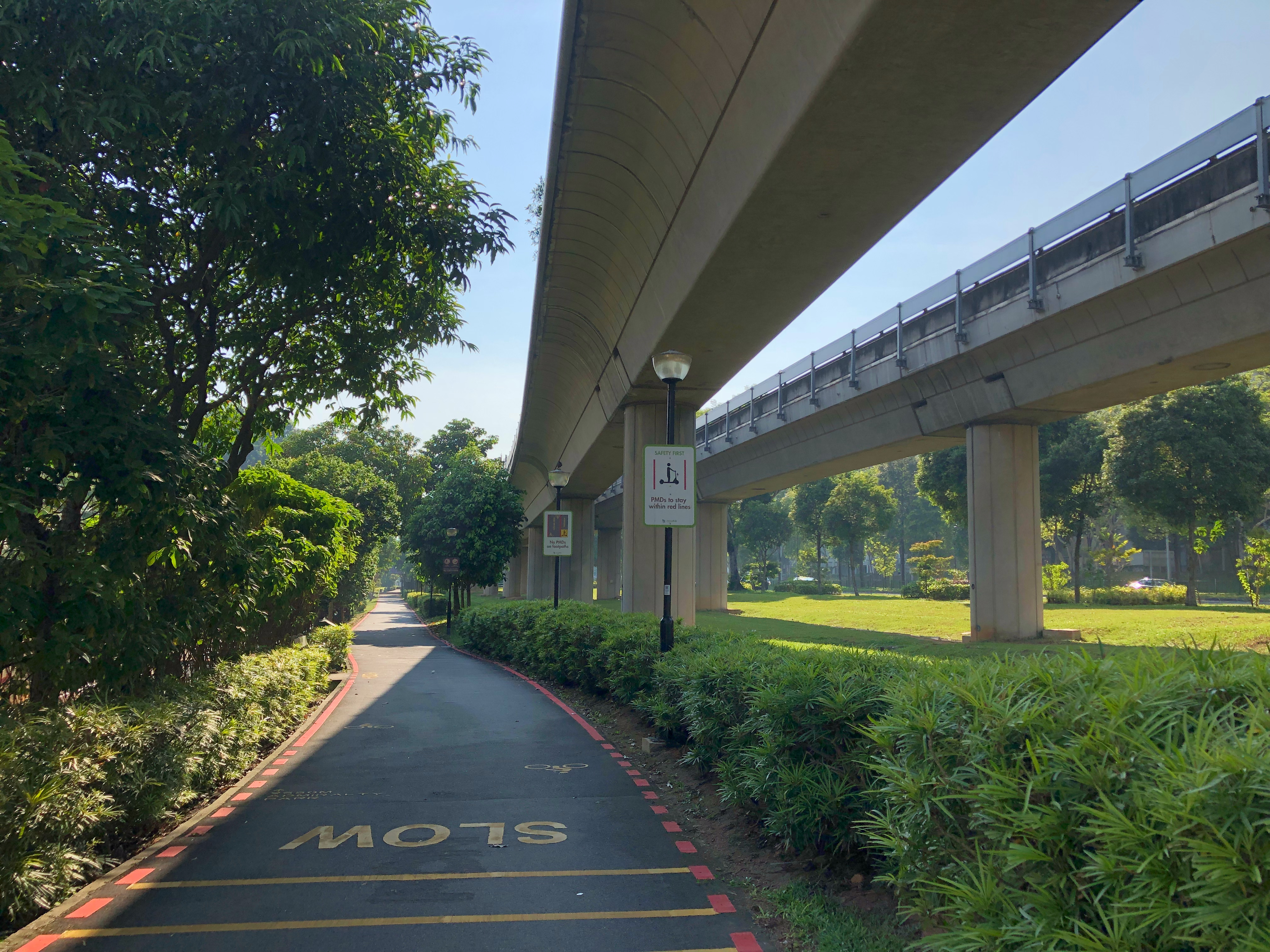
Woodlands Park Connector, with MRT tracks above

The Park Connector Network (PCN) is a network of walking, running and cycling paths in Singapore that connects the various parks and other green spaces throughout the country. Both the parks and the PCN are managed by National Parks Board (NParks).

As part of the National Cycling Plan to promote cycling, the Land Transport Authority (LTA) is also constructing networks of cycling paths around the country. These cycling paths connect with the PCN, enabling people to cycle both within and out of town.

As of 2025, there are 94 individual park connector routes. Most of these park connectors run alongside roads, rivers or canals, as well as underneath MRT viaducts.

== History ==
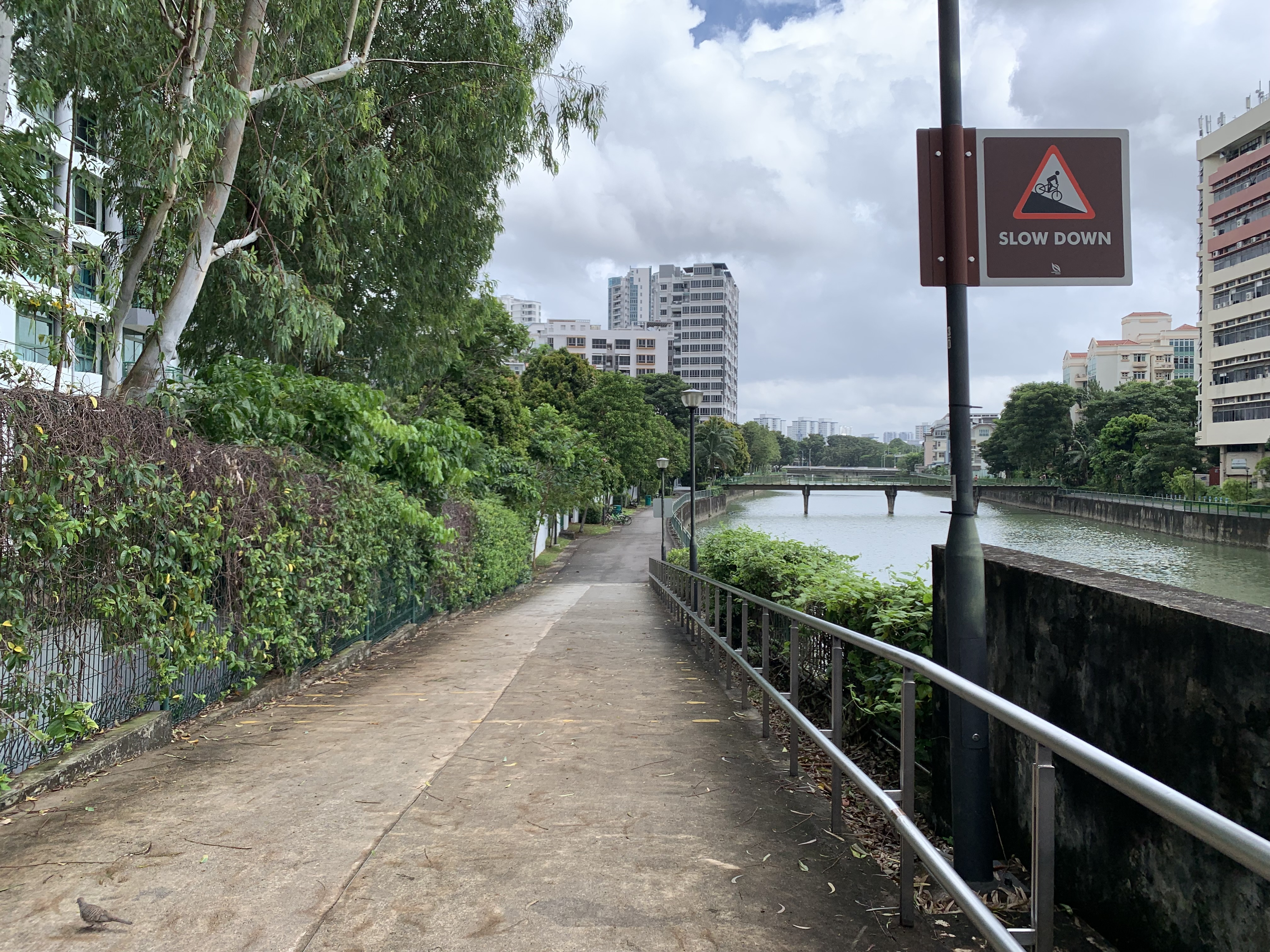
Kallang Park Connector, the first park connector, opening in 1995

The proposal to form a park connector network was approved in 1991 by the Garden City Action Committee. In 1995, Kallang Park Connector became the first park connector to be implemented. Stretching over 9 km (5.6 mi), the park connector links two regional parks: Bishan–Ang Mo Kio Park and Kallang Riverside Park. In December 2007, the 42 km (26 mi) Eastern Coastal Loop was completed, providing a link from East Coast Park to Changi Beach Park. The PCN had a total length of 200 km (120 mi) by January 2012, and 300 km (190 mi) by 2015, with the completion of the Central Urban Loop that same year.

== List of routes ==
Route		Length	Completion date	Ref.
Central Urban Loop		36 km	September 20, 2015; 10 years ago	
Eastern Coastal Loop		42 km	December 2007; 18 years ago	
Eastern Corridor		18 km	February 17, 2024; 2 years ago	
North Eastern Riverine Loop		26 km	TBD	
Northern Explorer Loop		25 km	TBD	
Round Island Route	Phase 1	75 km	January 22, 2022; 4 years ago	
Round Island Route	Phase 2	TBA	2035; 9 years' time	
Southern Ridges Loop		TBD		
Western Adventure Loop		20 km	TBD	

== See also ==
- List of parks in Singapore
- Urban planning in Singapore
- Rail Corridor (Singapore)
