= Admiralty Park =

National park in Singapore

Coordinates: 1.446392°N 103.780653°E

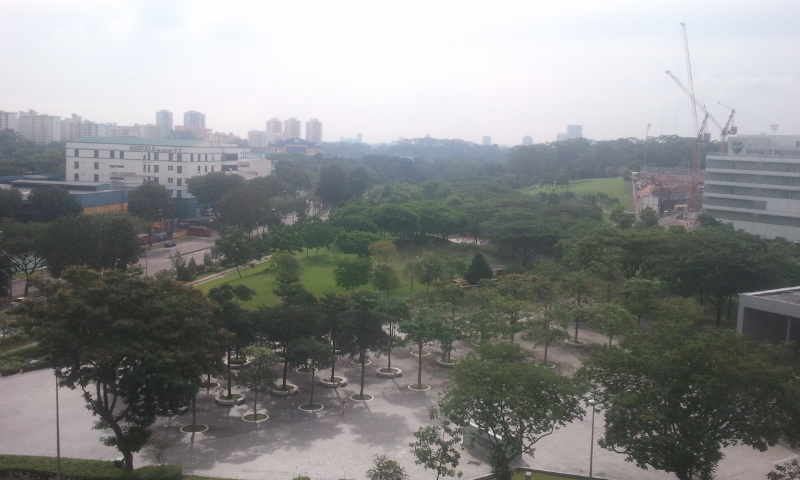
- Admiralty Park - looking north towards Johor

- Location within Singapore
- Interactive map of Admiralty Park
- Area: 27 hectares (67 acres)
- Manager: National Parks Board
- Status: Open

Admiralty Park is a national park in Singapore that is 27 hectares in size. It is made unique by its river valley shaped hilly terrain.

== Background ==
This feature reflects the history of the site, as it used to have Sungei Cina running through it. Visitors can use the main circulation path constructed alongside the valley.

The park has a nature area spanning 20 hectares in size, the biggest nature area within a park in Singapore. Much of the park is mangrove swamp. Three boardwalks cut through the mangrove, providing places for observing and appreciating the flora and fauna with minimal disturbance of the habitat. The park works closely with neighbouring Republic Polytechnic, which is also the adopter of the park under the adopt-a-park scheme. One collaboration with them has been the Admiralty Park E-Guide, an online guide to the plants in the park produced by students from the School of Applied Science.

Admiralty Park is also used for sports recreation purposes and to facilitate this there are fitness stations and a running track. Concerts and performances and hiking and nature walks also take place. Wi-Fi hotspots for visitors are provided at locations around the park. The park has been designated with the code 9V-0001 by the international Parks On The Air award program, and so is regularly 'activated' by Amateur Radio operators using portable equipment.

== Getting there (via public transportation) ==
The park is a 9-minute walk from Woodlands North MRT station via Republic Polytechnic and a 15-minute walk from Woodlands MRT station. The closest bus stop is Opp Progen Bldg, which serves buses 903 and 903M and is located at the doorstep of the park.

== See also ==
- List of Parks in Singapore
