= Sungei Buloh Wetland Reserve =

Nature reserve park in Singapore

- Sungei Buloh Nature Park
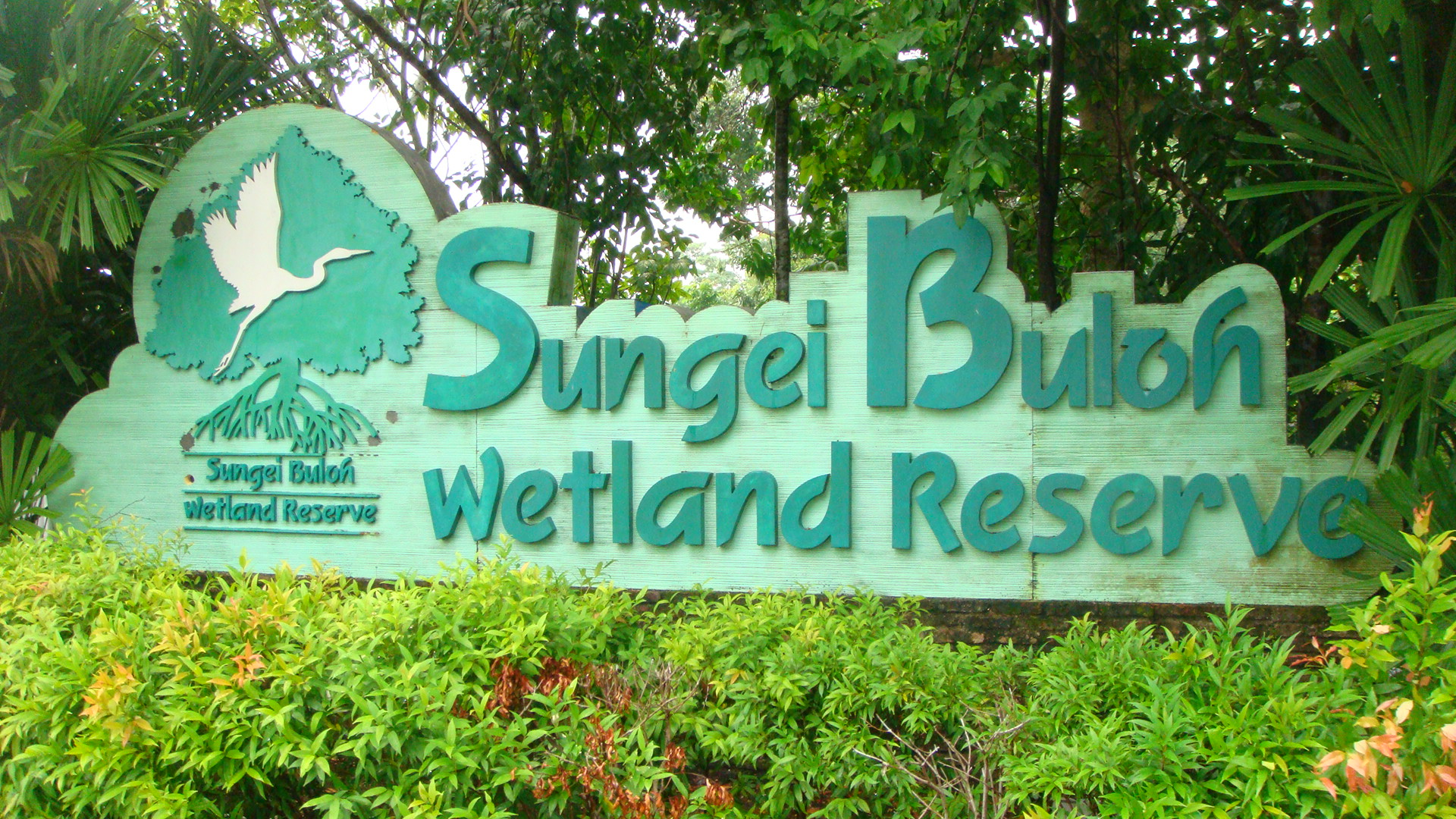

- Location within Singapore
- Type: Nature reserve
- Location: Singapore
- Coordinates: 1°26′46″N 103°43′44″E
- Area: 130 hectares (1,300,000 m^{2})
- Opened: 6 December 1993; 32 years ago (as Sungei Buloh Nature Park); 1 January 2002; 24 years ago (as Sungei Buloh Wetland Reserve)

Sungei Buloh Wetland Reserve (Note: (IPA: /ˈsʊŋaɪ ˌbuːloʊ/ SUUNG-eye BOO-loh, Chinese: 双溪布洛湿地保护区, Malay: Kawasan Simpanan Alam Semulajadi Sungei Buloh, Tamil: சுங்காய் புலோ ஈரநில வளம்)) is a nature reserve in the northwest area of Singapore. It is the first wetlands reserve to be gazetted in Singapore (2002), and its global importance as a stop-over point for migratory birds was recognised by the inclusion of the reserve into the East Asian Australasian Shorebird Site Network. The reserve, with an area of 130 hectares, was listed as an ASEAN Heritage Park in 2003.

== History ==
The wetlands of Sungei Buloh

Previously unheard of as a nature area, the site only gained prominence in 1986 when a call was made to conserve the area by members of the Singapore Branch of the Malayan Nature Society. Particularly significant was its unusually high variety of bird species, which included migratory birds from as far as Siberia on their way to Australia to escape the winter months. Their suggestion was taken up by the government, and a site with an area of 0.87 km^{2} was given nature park status in 1989. The Parks & Recreation Department, a precursor to today's National Parks Board, developed and managed the nature park with a team of experts. The most notable names from the team included the Wildfowl & Wetlands Trust from the United Kingdom and World Wide Fund for Nature. Sungei Buloh Wetland Reserve, then known as Sungei Buloh Nature Park, was officially opened on 6 December 1993 by then-Prime Minister Goh Chok Tong.

The government formally announced on 10 November 2001 that the park would be accorded nature reserve status, a step that protects the area from any unauthorized destruction or alteration. The second phase of the park was opened, and the entire site of 130 hectares officially gazetted on 1 January 2002 as the Sungei Buloh Wetland Reserve. It is one of the four nature reserves to be gazetted. The others are Labrador Nature Reserve, Bukit Timah Nature Reserve, and Central Catchment Nature Reserve.

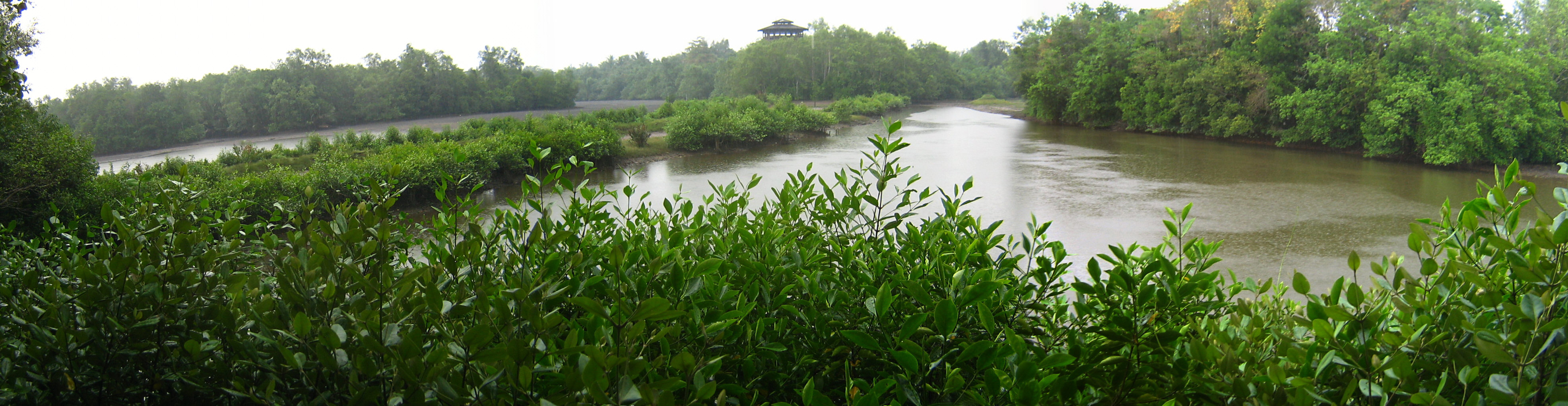
A view of the mangroves from one of the observation hides

== Wildlife ==
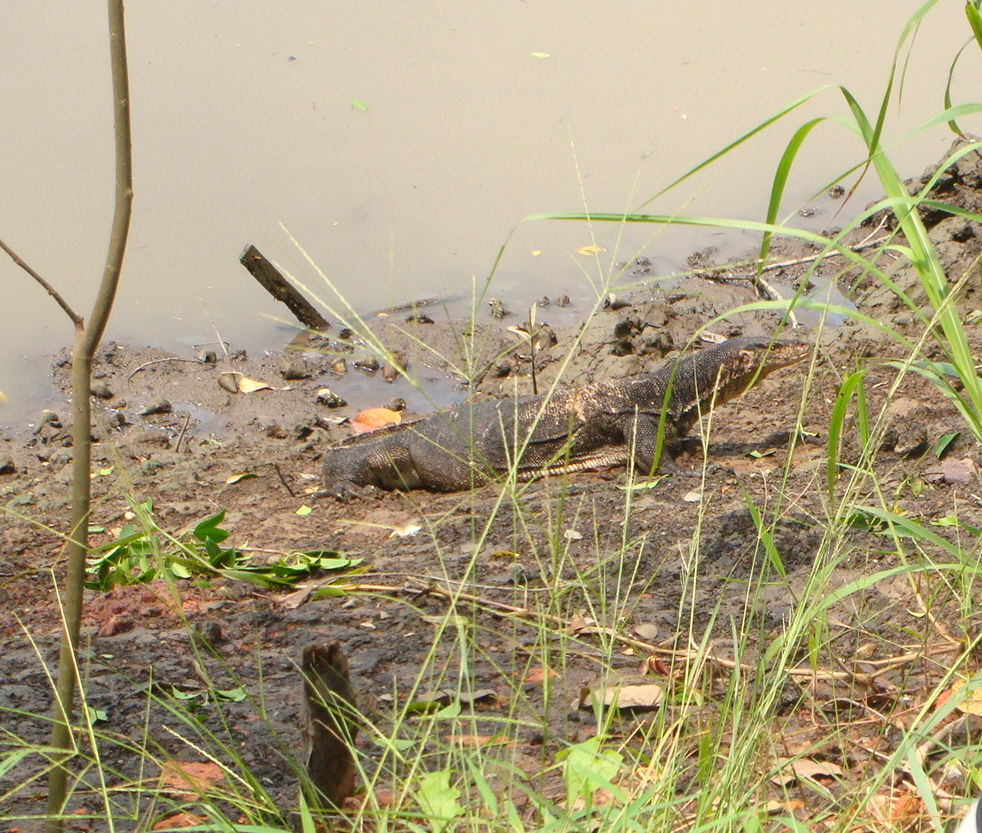
Malayan water monitor in Sungei Buloh

Among the many birds that can be spotted feeding on the diverse fauna variety of worms and molluscs, are Eurasian whimbrel, common greenshank, common redshank, Mongolian plover, curlew sandpiper, marsh sandpiper and Pacific golden plover, yellow bittern, and cinnamon bittern. Lucky visitors to the reserve may be able to spot the resident family of smooth otters, as well as the rare lesser whistling-duck, and the rare milky stork. The reserve forms part of the Kranji–Mandai Important Bird Area (IBA), identified as such by BirdLife International because it supports Chinese egrets, greater spotted eagles and greater crested terns. Atlas moth, the largest species of moth in Southeast Asia can be found in the back mangrove.

Multiple observation hides are available where visitors can observe the flora and fauna in the surroundings in tranquility and at a distance from the animals and birds. Saltwater crocodiles (Crocodylus porosus) are occasionally seen in the reserve, although it is not known whether or not these are individuals that had wandered over from Malaysia/Indonesia or a remnant localised population. (This species was once common in Singapore but was said to be extinct.)

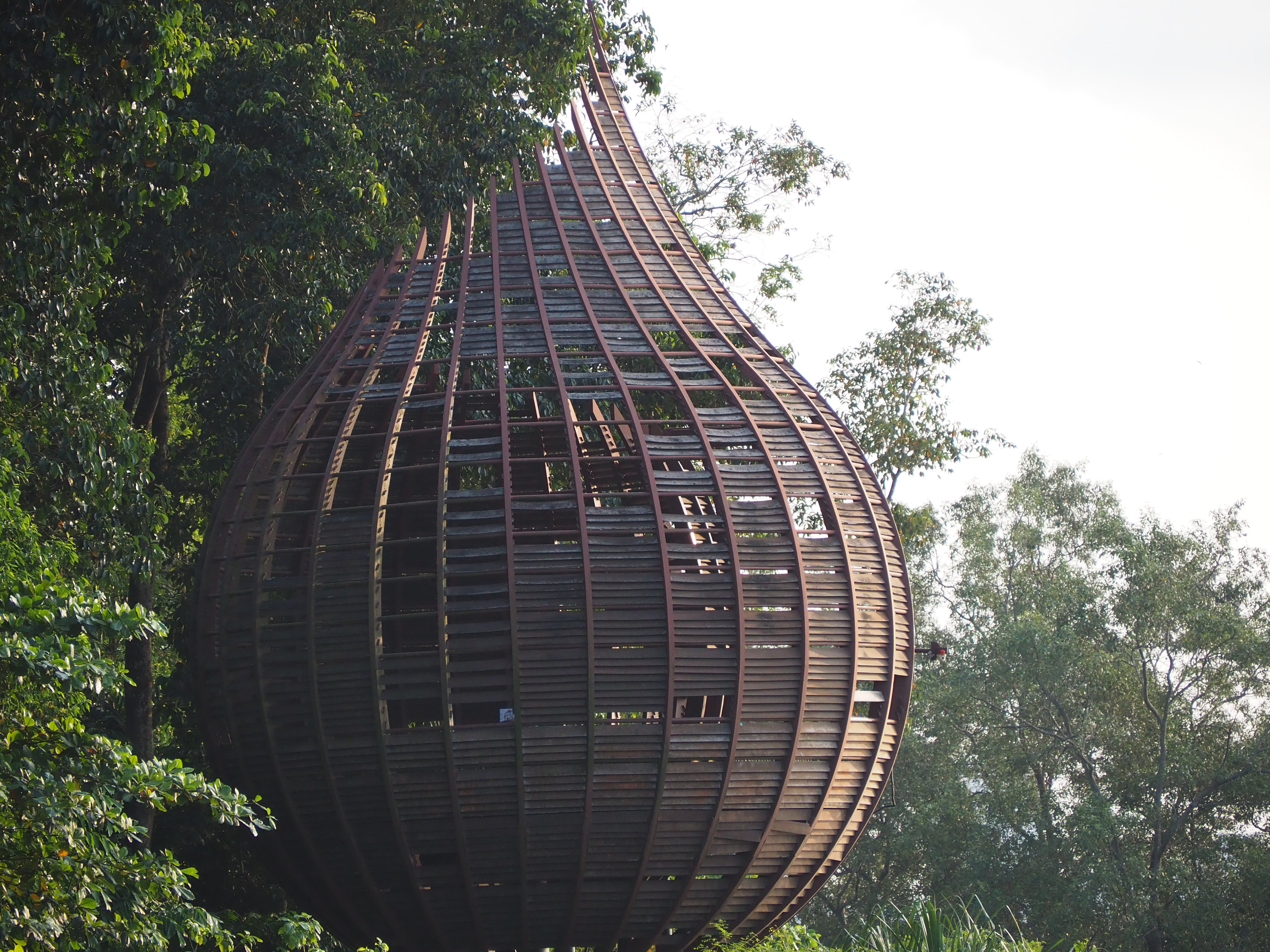
Observation hide in Sungei Buloh

=== Snakes ===
The park is home to many species of snakes including Dog-faced water snakes, Reticulated Python, Equatorial Spitting Cobra, Oriental whip snakes, and King cobras.

== Nature education ==
Since its inception, the reserve provided nature education programs as well as a volunteer guide programme for schools and the general public. These include the SUN Club programme which are meant for students with special needs, mentorship programmes for secondary school students and a Young Naturalists Programme. Many such programmes were collaboration efforts with partners such as the British Council and the Ministry of Education. The reserve distributes education materials such as workshops, guidebook and a triannual magazine, Wetlands, to further enrich the students and public. Each year, the nature reserve receives more than 400 organised school visits.

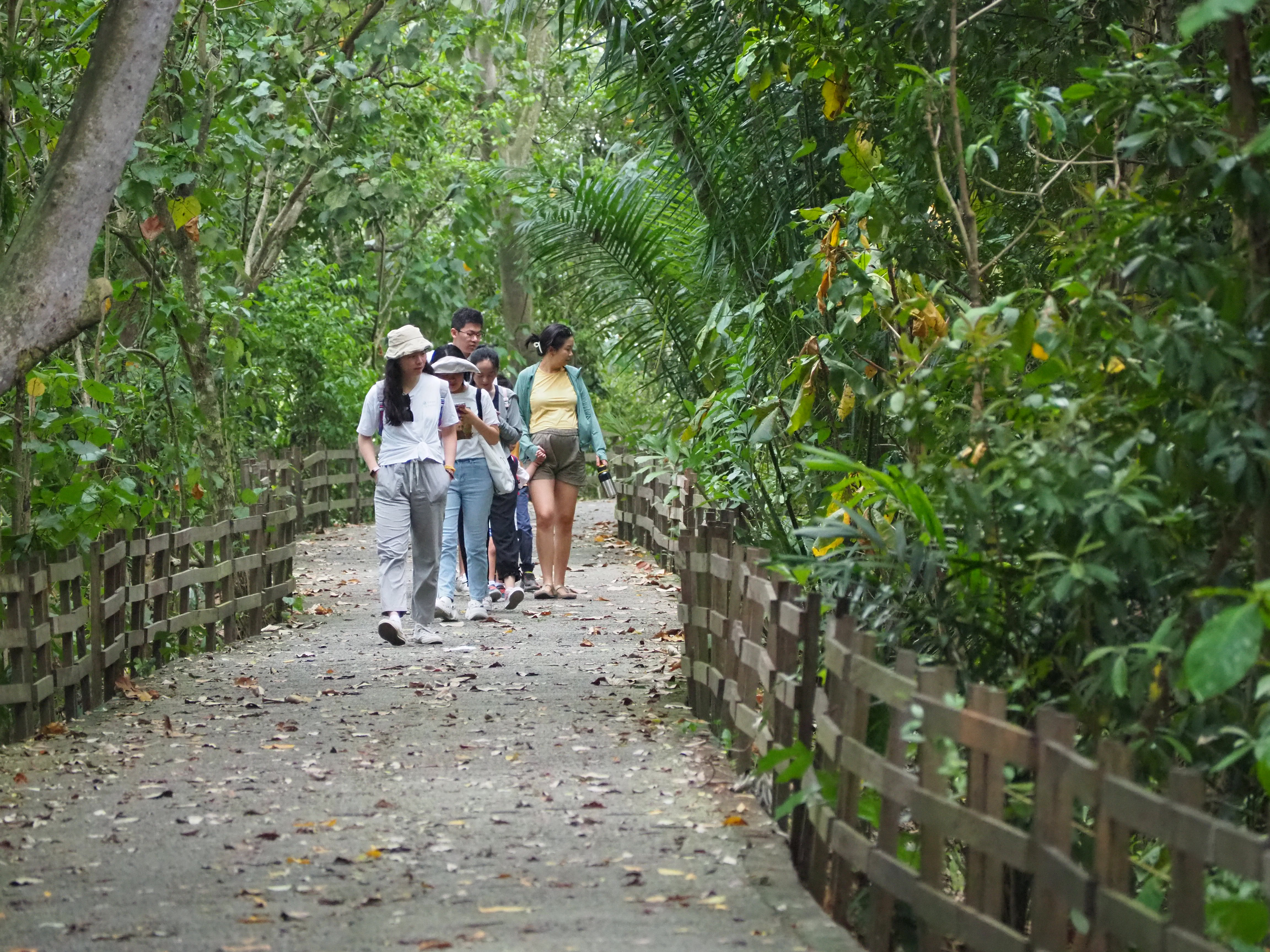
Visitors in the park

On 25 August 2007, a wireless learning trail was launched at Sungei Buloh Nature Reserve. The new initiative, which integrates technology with nature education, was a partnership amongst the Ministry of Education (MOE), Infocomm Development Authority of Singapore (IDA), and a private sector company iCELL Network. Sungei Buloh Nature Reserve was the first park in Singapore to engage such a learning method.

View from the main bridge

== See also ==
- Kranji Marshes
- List of parks in Singapore
