= Marsiling Park =

Garden in Woodlands, Singapore

Coordinates: 1.43752°N 103.76982°E

- Woodlands Town Garden
- Location within Singapore
- Type: Park
- Location: Woodlands, Singapore
- Area: 11 hectares (27 acres)
- Opened: 1983; 43 years ago (Woodlands Town Garden); 29 April 2018; 8 years ago (as Marsiling Park)
- Closed: July 2016; 10 years ago (upgrading)
- Operator: National Parks Board
- Status: Open

Marsiling Park, formerly Woodlands Town Garden, is a community park in Woodlands, Singapore, located at Woodlands Centre Road, adjacent to Bukit Timah Expressway.

== Background ==
In the decade preceding its upgrading works in 2016, the park was known for its vice activities. Following the complaints from the residents whom lived nearby, the park was closed for upgrading in July 2016.

The park was renamed as Marsiling Park and reopened on 29 April 2018.

== See also ==
- List of Parks in Singapore
