= Hindhede Nature Park =

Park in Singapore

Coordinates: 1.34874°N 103.77580°E

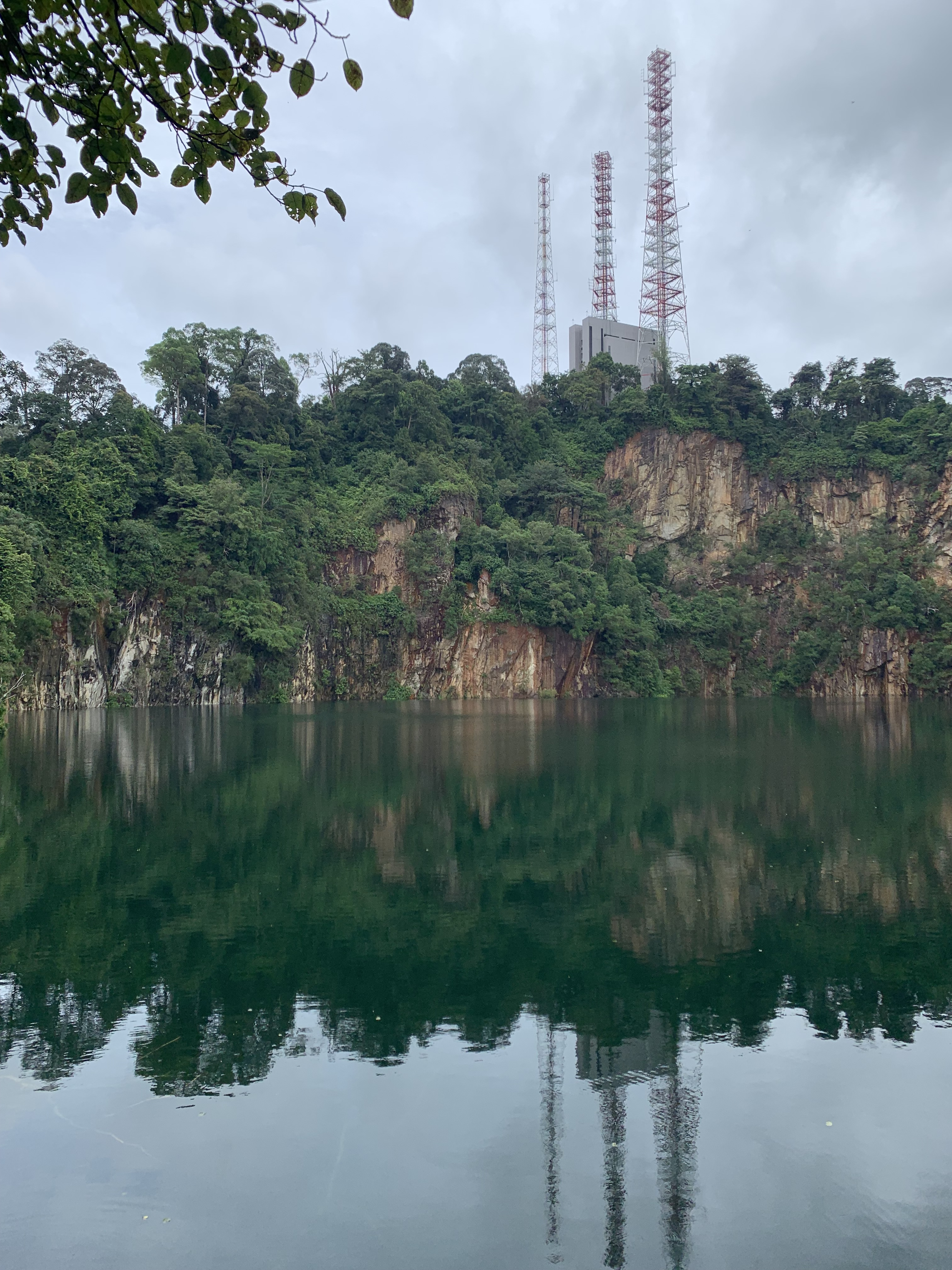
- Hindhede Quarry

- Location within Singapore
- Type: Nature park
- Location: Singapore
- Opened: 17 August 2001; 24 years ago
- Operator: National Parks Board
- Status: Opened
- Website: www.nparks.gov.sg/gardens-parks-and-nature/parks-and-nature-reserves/hindhede-nature-park

Hindhede Nature Park is a park located next to Bukit Timah Nature Reserve in Singapore.

== Background ==
Officially opened on 17 August 2001 by then Minister for National Development Mah Bow Tan, it is designed for families with young children.

A short trail leads into the park starting from the Bukit Timah Visitor Centre and looping to the Hindhede Quarry 90 metres away. Animals that can be found in the park include the Banded Woodpecker, Clouded Monitor Lizard, Greater Racket-tailed Drongo and Plaintain Squirrel.
