= Labrador Nature Reserve =

Coastal park in Singapore

Coordinates: 1°16′2″N 103°48′6″E

- Labrador Beach; Labrador Park
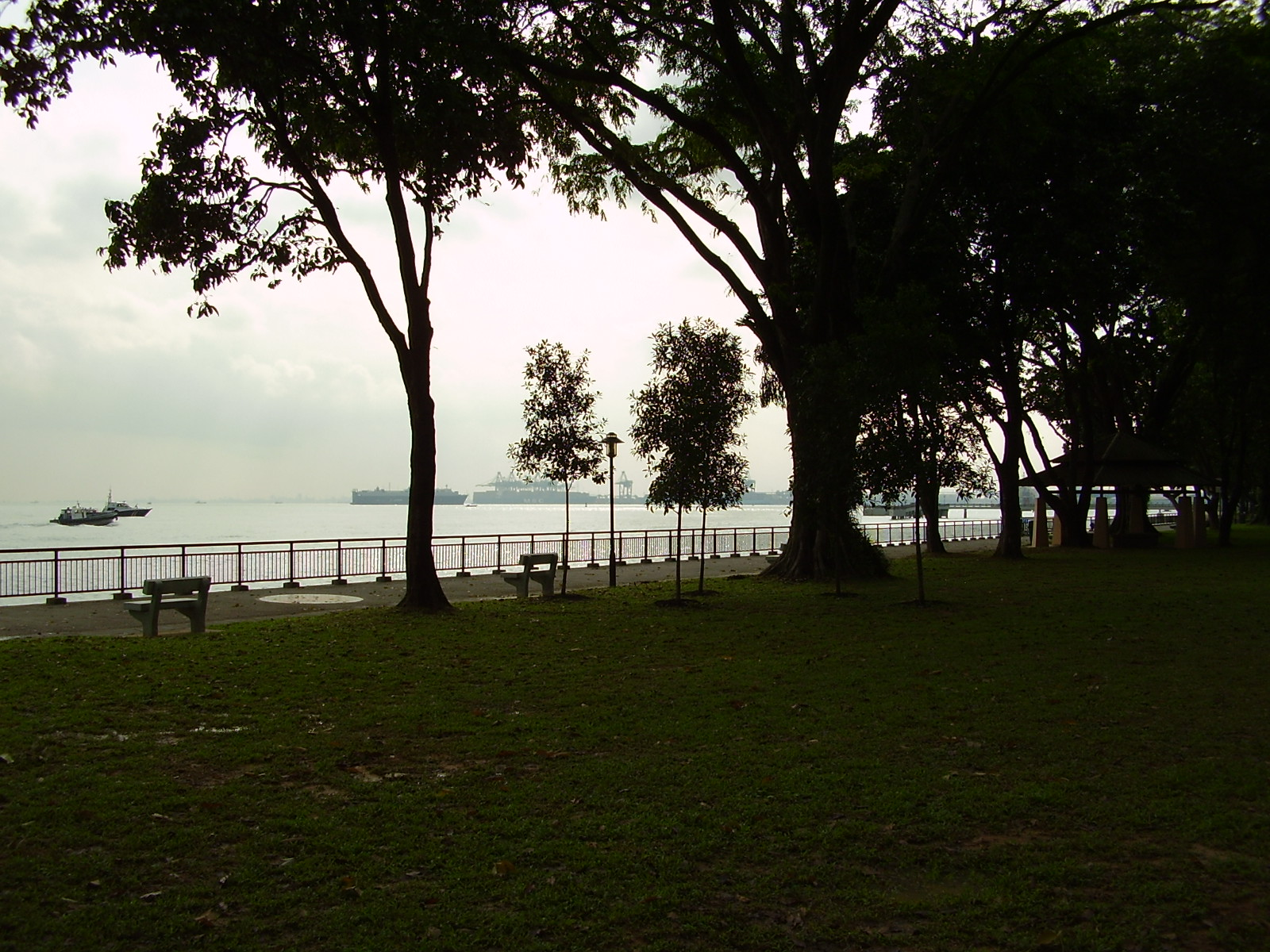
- Labrador Park

- Location within Singapore
- Type: nature reserve
- Location: Singapore
- Area: 10 hectares (100,000 m^{2})
- Established: 1951

Labrador Nature Reserve (Chinese: 拉柏多自然保护区, Malay: Kawasan Simpanan Alam Semulajadi Labrador), also known locally as Labrador Park (拉柏多公园, Taman Labrador), is located in the southern part of mainland Singapore. It is home to the only rocky sea-cliff on the mainland that is accessible to the public. Since 2002, 10 hectares of coastal secondary-type vegetation and its rocky shore have been gazetted as a nature reserve and its flora and fauna preserved by NParks.

== History ==
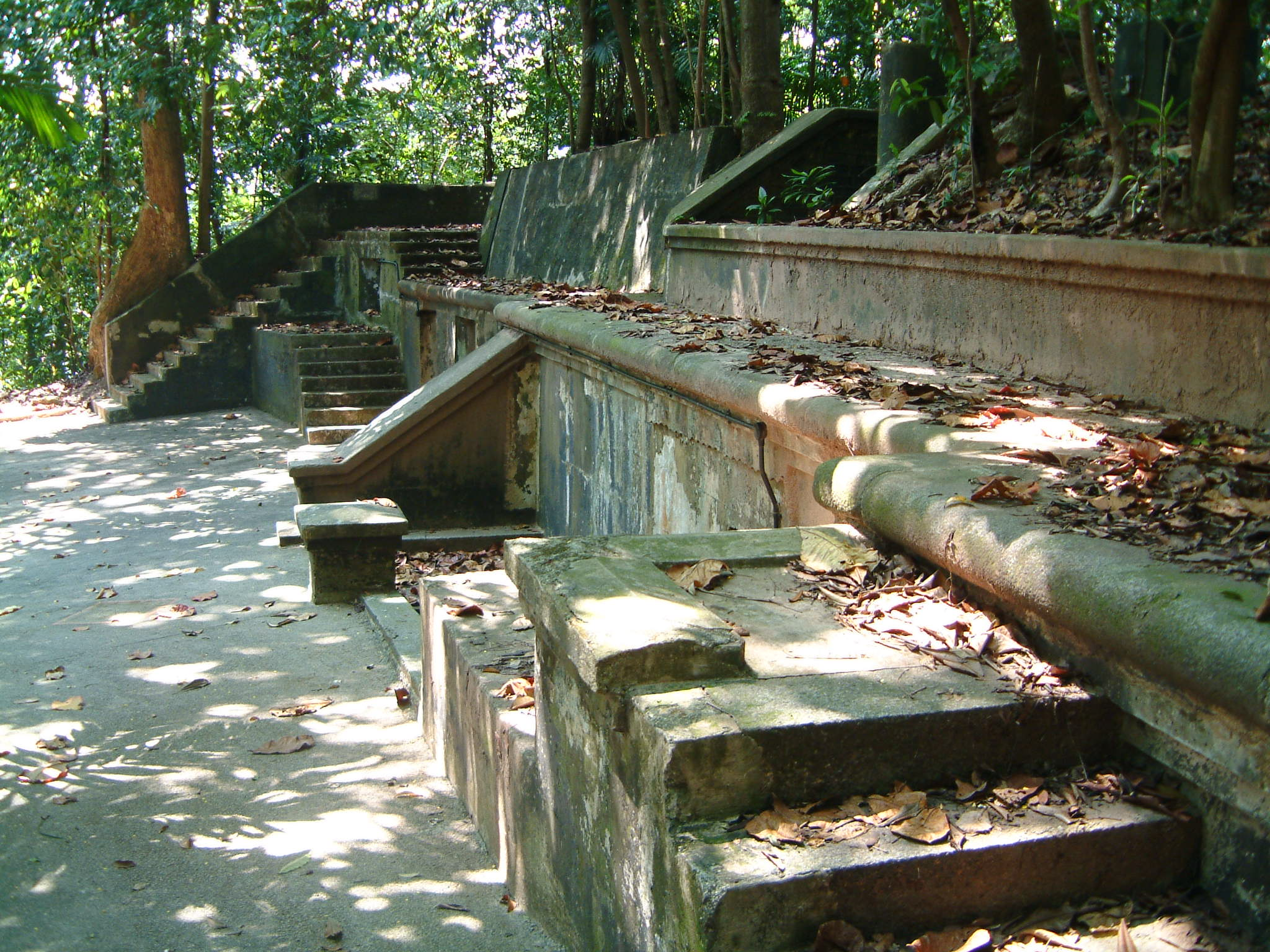
The remaining structures of the gun casemates and the underground bunkers of the old Fort Pasir Panjang

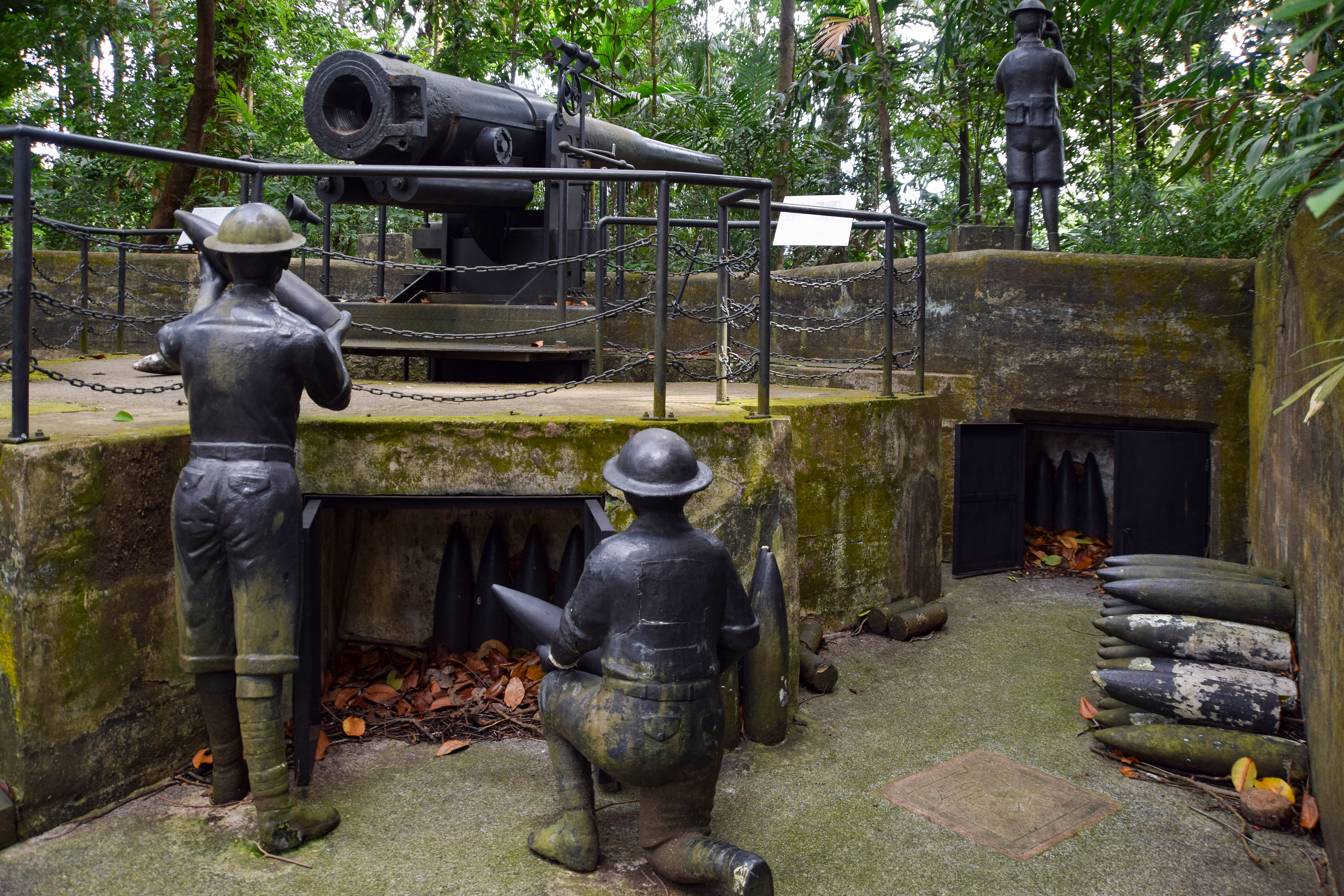
The reconstruction of a gun fortification at Fort Pasir Panjang in Singapore. The barrel itself is actually original.

Labrador Nature Reserve is the site where many historical relics and natural artifacts are located in Singapore, most of which date from World War II and earlier periods of time, much of which were left behind mainly by the former British colonial legacy on the island. This is due to the fact that the area has a long history dating way back to the 19th century and its playing of a significant role in the history of the city-state.

The entire nature reserve, together with the current park, used to be known as Pasir Panjang Beach (Pasir Panjang, translated from Malay, means similarly as "Long Beach"). The area used to be where a long strip of coastal land was at high tide and a rocky beach was at low tide before land reclamation took place and formed the seawall and the modern park seen today.

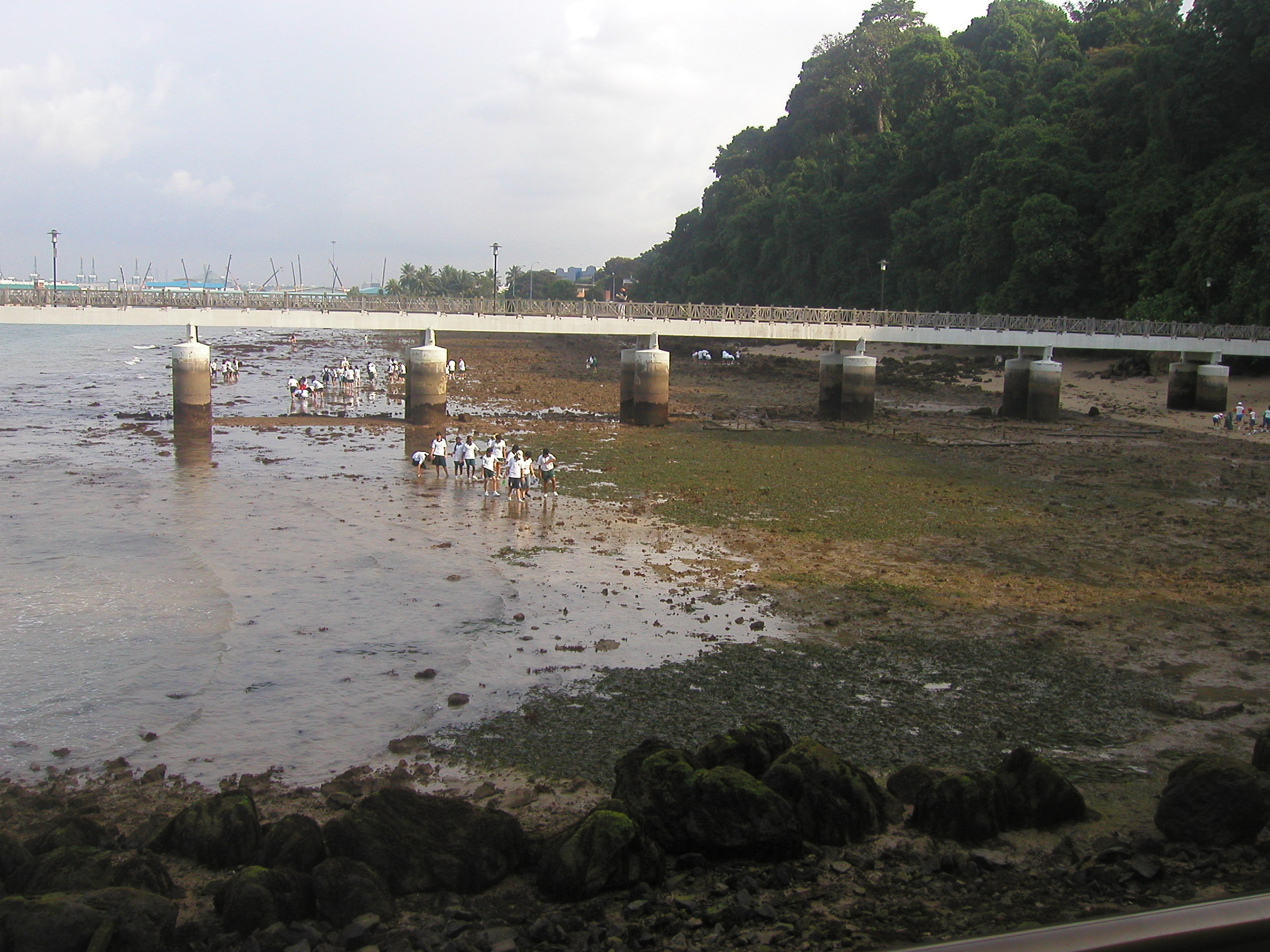
A picture of the remaining stretch of the original beach at Labrador Nature Reserve, with the rocky shoreline seen here at low tide. The long jetty in the picture used to be for oil pipelines that have since been dismantled and is now opened to the public

There was an old British military base (a fort), referred to as Fort Pasir Panjang, located on the top of the hill and above the cliff in front of the sea (the fort was first constructed as early as the 1890s). The cliff’s high vantage-point led the British government to identify it as a strategic defence site to protect the entrance to Keppel Harbour in the southern part of mainland Singapore as well as Singapore's southwestern coastline (near Pulau Blakang Mati (present-day Sentosa)). It became one of nine major sites where the British military had set up their gun batteries and is a crucial part of the entire British defence system for Singapore.

The rocky beach below the cliff was still accessible to the public at that time (lasting until the 1930s). The area was a popular place for recreational sports and there was also a seaside resort for the residents living in villas located in the surrounding areas, as well as for the nearby villages. In fact, there were even private beach-houses, self-constructed seawalls and personal jetties built along the area's shoreline.

In light of the Second Sino-Japanese War and the expansion of the military (especially the navy) of the Empire of Japan during the 1930s (when there was a worry by the USA and the UK about Japan's increasing aggressiveness and the country's rapid pace of militarization and desire to conquer most of Asia), the British government conducted a general review of the coastal defences in Singapore and showed that Pasir Panjang Beach would be an easy place for an enemy military force to land ashore. As a result, the surrounding land was taken over by the British colonial government and was redeveloped for an expansion of Pasir Panjang Fort. Machine-gun emplacements, artillery-gun casemates and barbed-wire entanglements were built and set up together with a fence running along the entire length of the beach. The artillery and coastal-defence guns facing the sea were also upgraded, such as the installation of two six-inch naval guns weighing 37 tonnes each, which could fire 102 lb shells up to a range of 10 miles, together with numerous searchlights that faced the sea to prevent an enemy naval force to conduct a night-time landing-and-invading operation and to seek out any enemy naval force approaching under the cover of darkness.

The British military strove to make the beach an element of a so-called "impenetrable fortress" as part of their strategy to turn Singapore into a powerful military base (which was believed by the British government to be akin to a "Gibraltar of the East") in Southeast Asia to protect the UK's colonial interests and territories in the surrounding region that would be shown by making it extremely difficult and costly (in manpower and related resources) for an invading enemy force to conquer Singapore and would have proven very useful in fending off an enemy naval force trying to land troops on the southern shorelines of Singapore.

Alas, there was not much combat action in the area of Pasir Panjang Beach during World War II. When Japanese military forces attacked their way into Singapore after taking over the whole of British Malaya by 1942, they invaded from the northern coast of mainland Singapore (along the Straits of Johor that marks the border between present-day Malaysia and Singapore) instead of the southern coast where the British military had initially expected. No Japanese naval vessels went past the southern coast of Singapore at all. As a result, much of the military equipment set up and constructed at the fort was left wasted and unused. The fort was then tasked to provide much-needed shelter and serve as storage place for ammunition and military equipment for the defending British troops in Singapore at the time of the Battle of Singapore. The fort was also located near where the Battle of Pasir Panjang took place (less than 10 km away). When the British military eventually surrendered to the invading Japanese military forces in Singapore on 15 February in 1942, the military equipment and ancillary facilities at the fort was quickly dismantled and/or destroyed by the surrendered British troops stationed there and it was closed down shortly afterwards. After the Japanese occupation of Singapore was finally over in 1945, the fort remained abandoned.

A large oil refinery was later set up not too far from the area by Japanese industrial firm Maruzen Toyo in 1961 (taken over by BP in June 1964 after the oil refinery was sold off by Maruzen Toyo) and a long jetty with pipelines for transporting crude oil to and from ships and the oil refinery was constructed (the jetty served two purposes, with the transportation of oil between the oil refinery and ships and the supplying of oil from oil-tankers to the nearby Pasir Panjang Power Station). At this period of time, the rocky beach saw few visitors as it was behind a high cliff and was quite inaccessible. It also had no relevant facilities in the area (such as toilets and lamp-posts). However, the surrounding forest and the coastline were still occasionally visited by adventurous nature-seekers and nature-explorers.

Labrador Beach was one of the five designated nature reserves that were established in 1951. This designation helped to prevent any extensive development from taking place in the area, which might threaten and endanger the flora and fauna of the immediate surroundings. However, in 1973, Labrador Beach's designation of a nature reserve was downgraded to that of a nature park. The future of the beach environment became uncertain as there were, at that time, no laws enacted which prevented the damage or destruction of nature parks. It was feared by many that the area would have to make way for a site for industrial development. There were consistent calls and appeals from the public to the government and the relevant authorities to preserve the rich history and the unique nature of the area, especially considering that the area was home to the last rocky shore and coral reef on mainland Singapore.

Finally, in November 2001, it was announced that Labrador Park (renamed from Labrador Beach) would be gazetted as a nature reserve once more. The old jetty (once owned by the nearby BP oil refinery, which was closed down and demolished by the end of the 1990s) was extensively renovated and opened to the public (it was initially opened daily from 7 am to 8 pm until it was declared by NParks to be closed indefinitely (due to safety reasons) at some time between 2014 and 2016, before being reopened once again but now being open for 24 hours), together with the rocky shoreline (now closed off indefinitely to the public), while much redevelopment and landscaping works took place in the reclaimed section of the part of the rocky beach right up to Tanjong Berlayer and just beyond to Berlayer Creek.

Also, in 2001, a labyrinth of tunnels, which were an integral part of the old fort built by the British government, were also discovered within the area of the park (located on the top of the cliff). These used to serve as a storage place for ammunition and other important military supplies, as well as being a base-camp for British troops guarding the fort. One of the tunnels goes under the waters of the entrance of Keppel Harbour and leads to Fort Siloso on Pulau Blakang Mati, present-day Sentosa (this is alleged by many to exist although there is a lack of concrete evidence to prove it). A small portion of the tunnels have since been opened to the public (but are recently declared to be structurally unsafe and have been sealed off until further notice).

== Wildlife ==
More than 70 kinds of birds, including the blue-crowned hanging parrot, the rufous woodpecker and Abbott's babbler, have been seen here. More than 11 species of butterflies have been recorded. In addition, the rocky shore contains a multitude of corals and crabs and more. These include sea grasses, sandworms and horseshoe crabs. The common hairy crab (Pilumnus vespertilio) is often spotted in the area.

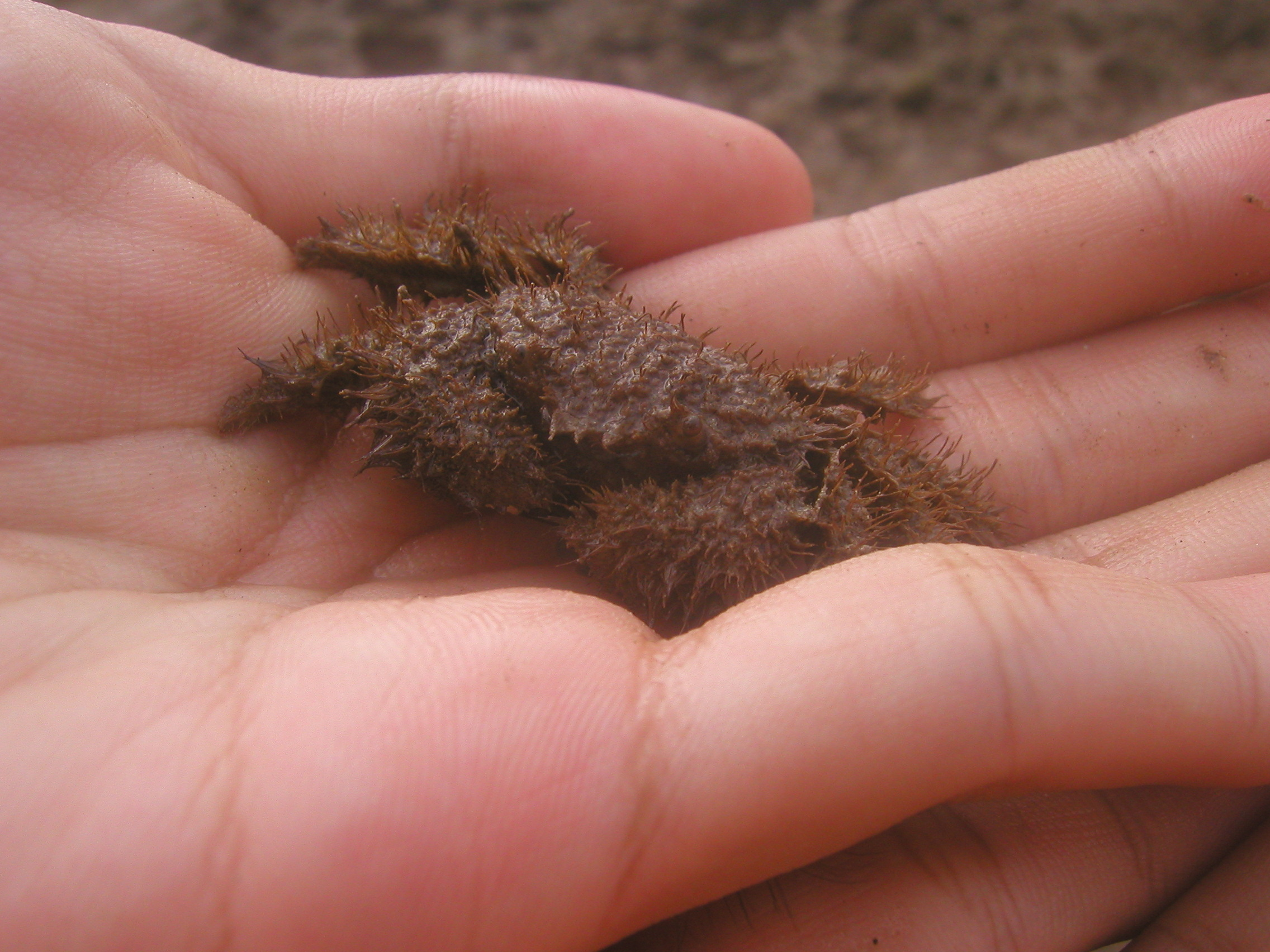
The common hairy crab (Pilumnus vespertilio)

== Other attractions ==
Other attractions include the remaining historical relics from WWII (such as the 6-inch naval gun (actually recovered from the former Beach Road Camp in the town-centre of Singapore and installed at an empty gun emplacement at the park) and the old gun casemates) and the fort's tunnels (the so-called Labrador Secret Tunnels).

== Ecological projects ==
=== Seagrass monitoring operations ===
NParks, National Biodiversity Centre, TeamSeagrass and volunteers from the public regularly conduct surveys and monitoring of the seagrasses found in Singapore, in inter-tidal areas such as Chek Jawa and Pulau Semakau. The seagrass meadow at Labrador Nature Reserve is one of the monitoring sites. These surveys are part of Seagrass-Watch, a global seagrass assessment and monitoring programme spanning 18 countries with more than 200 monitoring sites worldwide. Non-destructive scientific surveying methods developed by Seagrass-Watch are adopted. Data gathered is then fed back to Seagrass-Watch Headquarters, which then analyses the trends and condition of seagrass habitats at the local, regional and global scale.

=== Survey on intertidal sponges ===
The NParks, National Biodiversity Centre and the Tropical Marine Science Institute jointly launched a collaborative project to survey and identify the intertidal sponges around Singapore. The inter-tidal area of Labrador Nature Reserve is one of the 24 locations. Although sponges are commonly found on Singapore's shores, they are poorly known due to the limited studies conducted.

The 1-year study yielded a total of 102 species of intertidal sponges. One species new to science, Suberites diversicolor, was described and a large number of 40 species of intertidal sponges were recorded for the first time in Singapore.

== Transportation ==
Since the 8 October 2011, the Labrador Park MRT station on the Circle line (located just beside the entrance of the road leading to the park) offers a mode of public transport to the park. SBS Transit bus service 408 (available on weekends and public holidays only) used to be another mode of public transport to the park until 31 July 2016 (the bus service was officially terminated on the following day).
