= National Parks Board =

Statuary board of the Singapore government

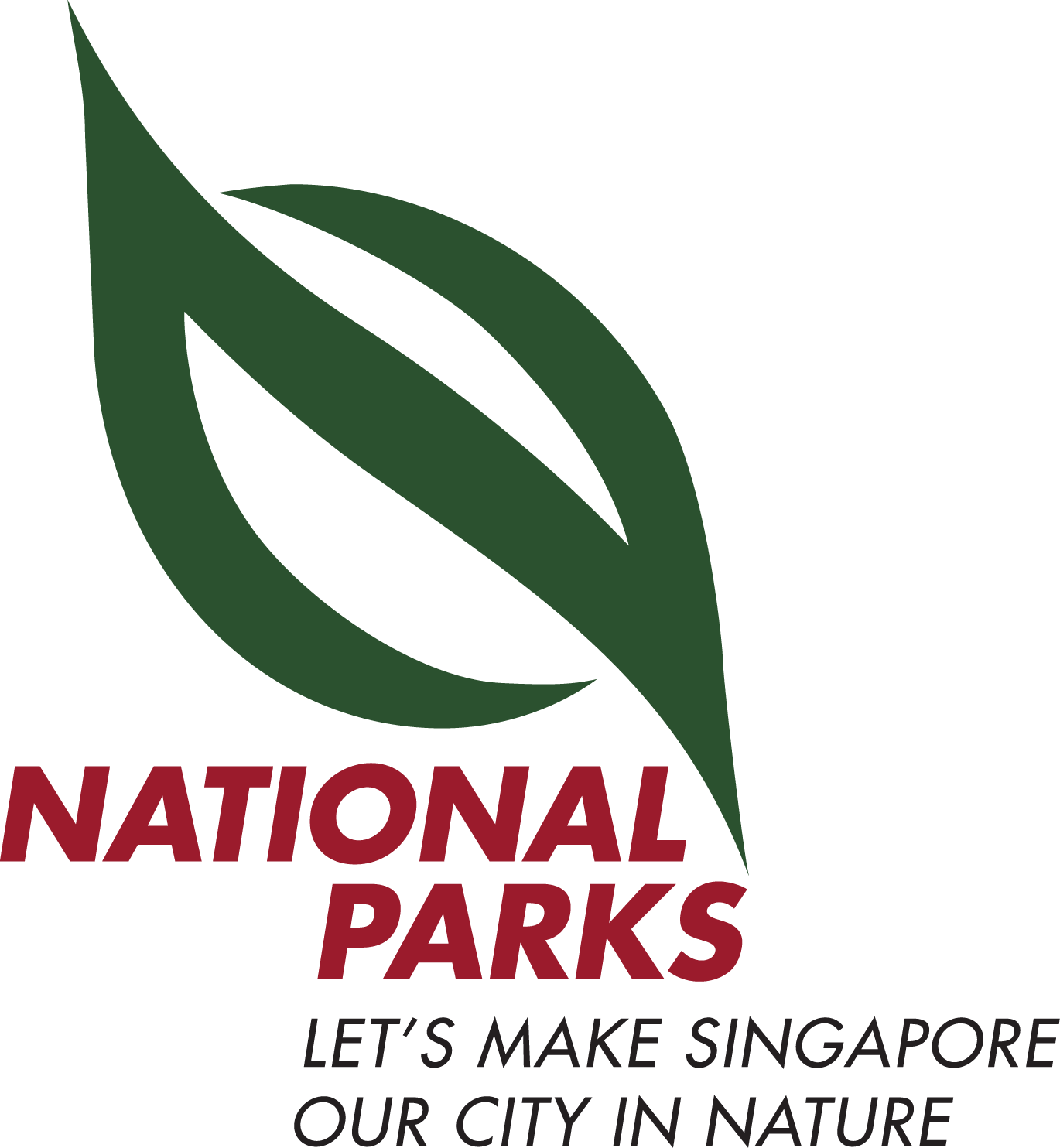

Agency overview
- Formed: 6 June 1990; 36 years ago
- Jurisdiction: Government of Singapore
- Headquarters: Singapore Botanic Gardens, 1 Cluny Road, Singapore 259569
- Motto: City in Nature
- Agency executives: Loh Khum Yean, Chairman; Hwang Yu-Ning, CEO
- Parent agency: Ministry of National Development
- Website: https://www.nparks.gov.sg
- Agency ID: T08GB0038E

The National Parks Board (NParks) is a statutory board under the Ministry of National Development of the Government of Singapore.

== History ==
In November 1989, Minister of National Development, S. Dhanabalan, presented the National Parks Bill in Parliament to form a body to manage the three parks, Singapore Botanic Gardens, Fort Canning Park and Bukit Timah Nature Reserve, in Singapore. In March 1990, Minister of State for National Development, Lee Boon Yang introduced the National Parks Bill in Parliament to form the National Parks Board as a statutory board.

On 6 June 1990, the National Parks Board was formed to manage the three parks.

On 1 July 1996, the Parks and Recreation Department was merged with the National Parks Board.

Since 1 April 2019, all non-food plant and animal-related functions originally under the Agri-Food and Veterinary Authority of Singapore were transferred to NParks under Animal and Veterinary Service (AVS) as part of a reorganisation.

In March 2020, then-Second Minister for National Development, Desmond Lee, announced a new vision for NParks: to further integrate nature into the city of Singapore, NParks would build on its prior goal of a "City in a Garden" to transform Singapore into a "City in Nature". This would entail creating at least another 200 hectares of nature parks, conserving 70 more native plant and animal species, constructing another 160 kilometres of park connectors, and ensuring that every household in Singapore is within a 10-minute walk of a park, by 2030.

== Activities ==
=== OneMillionTrees Campaign (2020 - present) ===
During the Committee of Supply debate in Parliament on 4 March 2020, then-Second Minister for National Development, Desmond Lee, announced that NParks would be launching a campaign, OneMillionTrees, to plant a million trees across Singapore over the next 10 years (i.e. by 2030). He explained that this would be a community initiative drawing on support from individuals and organisations, and that the trees would be planted "along our roads, in our parks, estates and green areas", as well as in some coastal areas.

Prior to the launch of the campaign, NParks was planting about 50,000 trees annually. Following the launch of the campaign, NParks aimed to double the number of trees planted annually.

In April 2023, NParks announced that more than 540,000 trees had been planted across the country since the launch of the campaign, such that it was three years ahead of the 2030 target to plant a million trees. Some of the trees planted as part of the campaign include the Pink Mempat, Giam Rambai, and paper bark trees.

== Notable incidents ==
=== Purchase of Brompton bikes (2012) ===
On 25 January 2012, the third day of the Chinese New Year period and a day on which many businesses will remain closed after the preceding two days of public holidays, NParks called a tender for foldable bikes via the government procurement portal, GeBiz. The tender closed six days (three working days) later on 30 January 2012. It was reported that NParks had purchased 26 Brompton bicycles at SGD 2,200 each, from BikeHop, which was the only bidder.

On 22 June 2012, local Chinese media outlet Lianhe Zaobao highlighted concerns about the procurement process for the purchase of the Brompton bicycles. The procurement process was also discussed on online forums such as HardwareZone, and forum letters to national broadsheets expressed concerns about the use of public funds. NParks commenced an internal investigation into the matter.

On 4 July 2012, Minister for National Development Khaw Boon Wan posted a blog post explaining that NParks needed foldable bikes to facilitate the movement of NParks' staff along park connector networks across the country. He stated that only one vendor responded to NPark's bid and he accepted NParks' explanation that the Brompton bicycles, whilst more expensive, were durable and require less maintenance, and accordingly that NParks had bought the right equipment. Khaw subsequently stated that NParks had reported its internal findings to him on 30 June 2012, and having read the report, he saw no reason to question to integrity of the officers involved in the procurement process. Nonetheless, he commissioned an internal audit of the procurement that same day.

On 14 July 2012, a letter from NParks CEO Poon Hong Yuen was published in a national newspaper, admitting that NParks could have handled the purchase better. In the letter, Poon explained that the rationale for the purchase of foldable bicycles was to boost productivity and that NParks had adhered with applicable government procurement guidelines in relation to the procurement process.

On 18 July 2012, Bernard Lim Yong Soon, an assistant director who had been assigned the task of obtaining approval for, and arranging NParks' purchase of foldable bicycles, was summoned for an interview before the Internal Audit Unit of the Ministry of National Development (MND). On 24 July 2012, it was reported that Lim had been suspended.

On 23 July 2012, MND reported NParks' purchase of the bicycles to the Corrupt Practices Investigation Bureau (CPIB).

In August 2012, Deputy Prime Minister Teo Chee Hean informed Parliament that the CPIB had completed its investigations and that the case was before the public prosecutor.

In 2014, Lim was convicted of lying to auditors in relation to purchase of the bicycles. Deputy Public Prosecutor Andre Jumbahoy had argued for a jail term of 3-4 months on the basis that there had been "pre-meditation". However, District Judge Marvin Bay rejected this and imposed a fine of SGD 5,000 instead.

=== Corrupt conduct by manager (2019) ===
In 2019, Lee Choon Ping, a NParks manager, was tasked to procure about 10,000 hats for an upcoming garden festival. He contacted Jota Tan Beng Khoon, who was the sole proprietor of SBM Easi Trade (a firm that supplies souvenirs, corporate gifts and events merchandise) and informed Tan that there was a "price war", thereby indicating to Tan that he should quote the lowest price possible to secure the contract. Tan eventually secured the contract to supply the hats.

Upon realising that NParks already had about 5,000 unused hats in storage, Lee instructed Tan to delivery just 5,000 hats and provide a refund for the remaining 5,000 hats into Lee's personal bank account. Lee subsequently informed Tan that he wanted the refund paid personally to him in SGD 1,000 notes.

During investigations, up-skirt photographs were also discovered on Lee's hard disk, which Lee had taken during an open house event which he had attended with his daughter on 7 March 2019.

In 2022, Lee was convicted of attempting to obtain corrupt gratification, cheating, and insulting the modesty of a woman. He was sentenced to a total of 11 months' jail. Seven similar charges of insulting modesty were taken into consideration.

=== Corrupt conduct by senior director (2022) ===
In 2022, Teva Raj Palanisamy was convicted of corruption for accepting six free trips between Singapore and Johor in exchange for abusing his position as a senior director of NParks to further the business interests of a NParks sub-contractor. He was sentenced to four months' jail and fined SGD 900.

== Leadership ==
Chief Executive Officer
Date	CEO	Comments
2010 - 16 February 2014	Poon Hong Yuen	
17 February 2014 - 31 May 2023	Kenneth Er Boon Hwee	
1 June 2023 - present	Hwang Yu-Ning	

Chairperson
Date	Chairperson	Comments
2018 - 30 September 2023	Benny Lim Siang Hoe	
1 October 2023 - present	Loh Khum Yean	

== See also ==
- List of parks in Singapore
