= WW =

WW, W&W, W/W, and variants, may refer to:

== Arts and entertainment ==
=== Fictional characters ===
- William Whopper, an evil property developer in the Australian 1980 children's TV programme Secret Valley
- Wonder Woman, a fictional superhero
- Walter White, a fictional meth kingpin

=== Works ===
- WW (album), 2005, by the Norwegian metal group Gehenna
- The Krotons, a 1968–1969 Doctor Who serial (production code WW)

=== Other uses in arts and entertainment ===
- W&W, a Dutch music duo
- Wiener Werkstätte, an association of architects, artists, designers and artisans in Vienna, Austria
- Adelaide Writers' Week, a literary festival held annually in Adelaide, South Australia

== Companies and organizations ==
=== Airlines ===
- MJets Air (IATA airlines code WW)
- Venezolana (IATA airline code WW)
- Bmibaby (2002-2012; IATA airline code WW)
- WOW Air (2012-2019; IATA airline code WW)

=== Other organizations ===
- Winchester and Western Railroad (reporting mark WW)
- Winter & Winter Records (W&W), a German record label
- Wüstenrot & Württembergische (W&W), a German financial services company
- WW International, an American dietetics and nutrition company, formerly called Weight Watchers
- WW Entertainment, a Dutch film distribution company

== Language ==
- "Wrong word", in proofreading
- ʬ , an IPA character
- ww (digraph), in Latin script

== People ==
- William H. Webster (1924–2025), director of the FBI and CIA, referred to in the Kryptos sculpture as "WW"
- Woodrow Wilson (1856–1924), President of the United States from 1913 to 1921

== Places ==
- County Wicklow, Ireland (vehicle plate code WW; region code WW, IE-WW)
- Westerwaldkreis, Germany (vehicle plate code WW)
- Route WW (Missouri), US, a secondary road

== Other uses ==
- "Warm white", a descriptor of light source color temperature, as defined in the JIS Z 9112 standard, and used by Exif tags
- Indian locomotive class WW
- NZR WW class of locomotive
- Weight Watchers (diet), a diet program by WW International
- Well-being washing
- World war
- Wall-to-wall (abbreviated w-w)
- Mass fraction (chemistry) (abbreviated "w/w")
- WW (formation), a soccer play

== See also ==
- Woodrow Wilson Teaching Fellowship, aka WW Teaching Fellowship
- WWS (disambiguation)
- WWW (disambiguation)
- W2 (disambiguation)
- 2W (disambiguation)
- W (disambiguation)
