= Fellow =

Title and form of address for learned or skilled individual

A fellow is a title and form of address for distinguished, learned, or skilled individuals in academia, medicine, research, and industry. The exact meaning of the term differs in each field. In professional societies or learned societies, the term refers to a privileged member who is specially elected in recognition of their work and achievements. Within institutions of higher education, a fellow is a member of a highly ranked group of teachers at a particular college or university, or in some universities, a member of the governing body. A fellow can also be a specially selected postgraduate student who has been appointed to a post (called a fellowship) granting a stipend, research facilities, and other privileges for a fixed period (usually one year or more) in order to undertake some advanced study or research, often in return for teaching services.

In the context of medical education in North America, a fellow (also known as a fellow physician) is a doctor who is undergoing a supervised, sub-specialty medical training (fellowship) after having completed a specialty training program (residency). Lastly, in large Research and Development-intensive institutions, the term denotes a small number of senior scientists and engineers.

== Education and academia ==
In education and academia, there are several kinds of fellowships, awarded for different reasons.

=== Teaching fellowships ===
The title of (senior) teaching fellow is used to denote an academic teaching position at a university or similar institution and is roughly equivalent to the title of (senior) lecturer. In the United Kingdom, the title (senior) fellow can also be bestowed to an academic member of staff upon retirement who continues to be affiliated to a university.

In the United States and the UK, the term teaching fellow or teaching assistant is used in secondary school, high school, and middle school settings for students or adults who assist a teacher with one or more classes.

=== Medical fellowships ===
In US medical institutions, a fellow (also known as a fellow physician) refers to someone who has completed residency training (e.g. in family medicine, internal medicine, pediatrics, general surgery, etc.) and is currently in a 1- to 3-year subspecialty training program (e.g. cardiology, sleep medicine/somnology, pediatric nephrology, transplant surgery, etc.).

=== Research fellowships ===
==== As an academic position ====
The title of research fellow may be used to denote an academic position at a university or a similar institution; it is roughly equivalent to the title of lecturer in the Commonwealth teaching career pathway.

==== As a financial grant ====
Research fellow may also refer to the recipient of an academic financial grant or scholarship. For example, in Germany, institutions such as the Alexander von Humboldt Foundation offer research fellowships for postdoctoral research and refer to the holder as research fellows, while the award holder may formally hold a specific academic title at their home institution (e.g., Privatdozent). These are often shortened to the name of the programme or organization, e.g. Dorothy Hodgkin Fellow rather than Dorothy Hodgkin Research Fellow, except where this might cause confusion with another fellowship, (e.g. Royal Society University Research Fellowship.)

In the context of graduate school in the United States and Canada, a fellow is a recipient of a postgraduate fellowship. It is granted to prospective or current students on the basis of their academic or research achievements.

Examples include the NSF Graduate Research Fellowship, the DoD National Defense Science and Engineering Graduate Fellowship, the DOE Computational Science Graduate Fellowship, the Guggenheim Fellowship, the Rosenthal Fellowship, the Frank Knox Memorial Fellowship, the Woodrow Wilson Teaching Fellowship, and the Presidential Management Fellowship.

In the UK, research fellowships are awarded to support postdoctoral researchers such as those funded by the Wellcome Trust and the Biotechnology and Biological Sciences Research Council (BBSRC). At ETH Zurich, postdoctoral fellowships support incoming researchers. The MacArthur Fellows Program (aka "genius grant") is a prestigious research fellowship awarded in the United States.

=== Fellowships as a training program ===
Fellowships may involve a short placement for capacity building, e.g., to get more experience in government, such as the American Association for the Advancement of Science's fellowships and the American Academy of Arts and Sciences fellowship programs. Some institutions offer fellowships as a professional training program as well as a financial grant, such as the Balsillie School of International Affairs, where tuition and other fees are paid by the fellowship.

=== Fellowships as a special membership grade ===
Fellows are often the highest grade of membership of many professional associations or learned societies: for example, the Chartered Institute of Arbitrators, the Chartered Governance Institute, Royal College of Surgeons, the Institution of Chemical Engineers, or the Royal Society of Chemistry. Lower grades are typically referred to as members (who typically share voting rights with the fellows) or associates (who may or may not, depending on whether "associate" status is a form of full membership). Additional grades of membership exist in, for example, the Institute of Electrical and Electronics Engineers (IEEE) and the Association for Computing Machinery (ACM).

Fellowships of this type can be awarded as a title of honor in their own right, e.g. the Fellow of the Royal Society (FRS) or Fellow of the Royal Academy of Engineering (FREng). Exclusive learned societies, such as the Royal Society, have Fellow as the only grade of membership.

Appointment as an honorary fellow in a learned or professional society may be made either to honour exceptional achievement or service within the professional domain of the awarding body, or to honour contributions related to the domain by someone who is professionally outside it. Membership of the awarding body may or may not be a requirement.

How a fellowship is awarded varies for each society, but may typically involve some or all of the following:

- A qualifying period in a lower grade
- Passing a series of examinations
- Nomination by two existing fellows who know the applicant professionally
- Evidence of continued formal training post-qualification
- Evidence of substantial achievement in the subject area
- Submission of a thesis or portfolio of works which will be examined
- Election by a vote of the fellowship

=== In ancient universities ===
At the ancient universities of Oxford, Cambridge, and Trinity College, Dublin, members of the teaching staff typically have two affiliations: one as a reader, lecturer, or other academic rank within a department of the university, as at other universities, and a second affiliation as a fellow of one of the colleges of the university. The fellows, sometimes referred to as university dons, form the governing body of the college; they may elect a council to handle day-to-day management. All fellows are entitled to certain privileges within their colleges, which may include dining at High Table (free of charge) and possibly the right to a room in college (free of charge).

At Cambridge, retired academics may remain fellows. At Oxford, however, a governing body fellow would normally be elected a fellow emeritus and would leave the governing body upon their retirement. Distinguished old members of the college, or its benefactors and friends, might also be elected "Honorary Fellow", normally for life: but beyond limited dining rights, this is merely an honour. Most Oxford colleges have "Fellows by Special Election" or "Supernumerary Fellows", who may be members of the teaching staff, but not necessarily members of the governing body.

Some senior administrators of a college, such as bursars, are made fellows, and thereby members of the governing body, because of their importance to the running of a college.

=== In the US ===
At some universities in the United States, "fellows" are members of the board of trustees who hold administrative positions as non-executive trustees rather than academics.

== Industry and corporate fellows ==
In industries intensive in science, engineering, medicine, and research and development, companies may appoint a very small number of top senior researchers as corporate, technical, or industry fellows, either in Science or in Engineering; these are internationally recognised leaders in their respective fields.

Corporate, Technical or Industry Fellow in either Science or Engineering are the most senior rank title one can achieve in a scientific or engineering career, though fellows often hold additional business titles, such as Vice President or Chief Technology Officer.

Notable examples of fellows in scientific, medical, and other research-intensive organizations include:

- Advanced Micro Devices (AMD) Fellows
- Apple Fellows
- Battelle Fellows
- Bell Labs Fellows
- Boeing Fellows
- Deloitte Fellows
- DXC Technology Fellows
- DuPont Fellows
- Google Fellows
- Henry Ford Technical Fellows
- HP Fellows
- Intel Fellows
- Microsoft Fellows
- NASA Fellows
- Oak Ridge National Laboratory (ORNL) Fellows
- RTI International Fellows
- Toray Fellows

=== Nonprofit and government fellowships ===
The title fellow can be used for participants in a professional development program run by a nonprofit or governmental organization. This type of fellowship is a short–term work opportunity (1–2 years) for professionals who already possess some level of academic or professional expertise that will serve the nonprofit or government mission. Fellows are given a stipend, as well as gaining professional experience and leadership training.

== See also ==
- Honorary title (academic)
- List of science awards
