= WSS =

WSS may refer to:

== Computing ==
- WebSocket URI scheme, e.g. wss://example.com
- WebSideStory, a web analytics company
- Windows Sound System
- Windows SharePoint Services
- WS-Security (meaning Web Services Security)

== Schools ==
- Westdale Secondary School, a public high school in Hamilton, Ontario
- Whitley Secondary School, a secondary school in Bishan, Singapore
- Wellington Secondary School, a secondary school in Nanaimo, British Columbia
- Woree State School, a public school in Cairns, North Queensland

== Societies ==
- Western Shugden Society
- World Ship Society
- Washington Statistical Society, a professional society of statisticians near Washington DC

== Technology ==
- Wavelength Selective Switching
- Widescreen signaling

== Other uses ==
- Warehouse shoe sale, a retail chain of shoe stores
- Weekly Shōnen Sunday, a Japanese manga magazine
- Wide sense stationary
- Winston-Salem Southbound Railway
- World Schools Style debate, a competitive debating format
- Working Set Size
- While She Sleeps, a metalcore band from Sheffield, England
- White spot syndrome, white spot disease in shrimps
- War of the Spanish Succession, shortcut used in wargaming community

== See also ==
- WSSS
- W2S
- WS2 (disambiguation)
- WS (disambiguation), for the singular of WSs
- WWS (disambiguation)
