= Christopher Magee =

Christopher Magee may refer to:

- Christopher Magee (politician) (1848–1901), political boss in Pittsburgh, Pennsylvania, United States
- Christopher Magee (fighter pilot) (1917–1995), United States Marine Corps aviator
- Christopher L. Magee (born 1940), American mechanical engineer, academic and researcher
