= WSSS =

WSSS may refer to:

- Changi Airport (ICAO airport code WSSS, since 1981), Singapore
- Singapore International Airport (ICAO airport code WSSS, closed 1981), Singapore
- WSSS-LP, Steubenville, Ohio, USA; a radio station
- WSSS-FM (callsign used 1994–2003), Charlotte, North Carolina, USA; a radio station, former name of WKQC 104.7 FM
- World Silent Security Service, a fictional organization from the 1995 videogame Robotica

== See also ==
- WS3 (disambiguation)
- WSS (disambiguation), for the singular of WSSs
- WS (disambiguation)
