= Wii (disambiguation) =

The Wii is a video game console developed and marketed by Nintendo.

Wii may also refer to:

- Wii (video game series), a series of games that start with "Wii"
- Wildlife Institute of India (WII)

== See also ==
- Wii U, the Wii's successor
- W2 (disambiguation)
- World War II (WWII)
- WIII (disambiguation)
