= WWS =

WWS may refer to:

== Groups, organizations ==
- Waterways Watch Society, Singapore; part of the Singapore Green Plan
- Wayanad Wildlife Sanctuary, Wayanad, Kerala, India
- Woodrow Wilson School of Public and International Affairs (WWS), Princeton University, Princeton, New Jersey, USA

== Arts, entertainment, media ==
- Sony Worldwide Studios (WWS, SCE WWS, SIE WWS), a PlayStation videogame studio, part of Sony
- WWS, a record prefix code used by White Whale Records

== Energy and power ==
- well velocity survey; see List of abbreviations in oil and gas exploration and production
- wind-water-solar / wind-water-sunlight, in renewable energy; see 100% renewable energy

== Sports ==
- World Women's Snooker, global organization of snooker for women
- World W*ING Spirit (2001–2017), a former Japanese pro-wrestling organization, a successor to W*ING
- Women Wrestling Stars, a Mexican pro-wrestling promotion, a participant in the SWA World Championship
- World Wrestling Stars (est. 2006), a Puerto Rican pro-wrestling promotion that split off from World Wrestling Council
- World Wrestling Stars (20th century), former name of World Wrestling Alliance (Massachusetts), a U.S. pro-wrestling tour based in New England

== Transportation and vehiclular ==
- Wild Weasel Squadron, U.S. Air Force
- Wojskowe Warsztaty Szybowcowe (W.W.S.; Polish: Military Glider Workshops), Polish aircraft maker; see List of gliders (W)
- Worldwide Aviation Services (ICAO airline code WWS), Pakistan; see List of airline codes (W)

== Other uses ==
- Walker–Warburg syndrome, a form of autosomal recessive congenital muscular dystrophy

== See also ==
- WWSS
- W2S
- 2WS
- WW (disambiguation), for the singular of WWs
- WSS (disambiguation)
