= Haren S. Gandhi =

Indian-American inventor and engineer (1941–2010)

Haren S. Gandhi (May 2, 1941 – January 23, 2010) was an American inventor and engineer, a recipient of the U.S. National Medal of Technology and Innovation, noted for his research and inventions in the field of automotive exhaust catalysts. Gandhi was elected to the National Academy of Engineering in 1999 "for contributions to the research and development of automotive catalysts". Gandhi held 61 U.S. patents. He was also the director of chemical engineering and a Henry Ford Technical Fellow at the Ford Motor Company. President George W. Bush presented Gandhi with the National Medal of Technology and Innovation at the White House in 2003. The National Academy of Engineering called Gandhi "one of the world's foremost authorities in the area of automotive emissions control".

== Chronology ==
- 1941: born on May 2 in Calcutta, India as Harendra Sakarlal Gandhi
- 1963: first class honours degree from the Department of Chemical Technology at the University of Bombay (now ICT Mumbai)
- 1967: joins Ford Motor Company as a research scientist
- 1967: M.S., the University of Detroit
- 1971: Ph.D. in Chemical Engineering, the University of Detroit
- 1999: elected to the National Academy of Engineering
- 2003: George W. Bush's the National Medal of Technology and Innovation
- 2010: died on January 23

== Legacy ==
In 2010 the Ford Motor Company introduced the Haren Gandhi Research and Innovation Award in his honor for his contributions in the field of automotive exhaust catalysts and as one of its employees. It is awarded annually by Ford to members of its staff as the company's highest technical award, given to outstanding technical individuals for their significant contributions in their field of study. Award winners: Yan Fu (2025), Christine Lambert (2024), Mark Nichols (2023), Vasiliy Krivtsov (2021), Gopichandra Surnilla (2020), Saeed Barbat (2019), Suzhou Huang (2019), Mrdjan Jankovic (2018), Pete Friedman (2017), Jeff Greenberg (2016), Debbie Mielewski (2015), Elizabeth Baron (2014), Louis Tijerina (2013), Tim Wallington (2011), and Dimitar Filev (2010).
