= WIII =

WIII may refer to:

- Soekarno–Hatta International Airport (ICAO code "WIII") in Jakarta, Indonesia
- WIII (FM) 99.9, a radio station in Cortland, New York, United States
- WSTR-TV, whose former calls were WIII, in Cincinnati, Ohio, United States

== See also ==
- WII (disambiguation)
- World War III (WWIII)
