= 3W =

3W or 3-W may refer to:

- 3W (company), or World Wide Wargames, a wargame company founded in 1977
- 3rd meridian west, a longitude coordinate
- OK-3W; see Oklahoma State Highway 3
- ZPG-3W, a model of N class blimp
- SLC-3W, a designation for Vandenberg AFB Space Launch Complex 3
- TBM-3W, a model of Grumman TBF Avenger
- AD-3W, a model of Douglas A-1 Skyraider
- 3W, a fictional place appearing in "Dark Water" and "Death in Heaven": episodes of the science-fiction show Doctor Who

== See also ==
- WWW (disambiguation)
- W3 (disambiguation)
- 3 (disambiguation)
- W (disambiguation)
