= WWW (disambiguation) =

WWW is the World Wide Web, a system of interlinked hypertext documents accessed via the Internet.

WWW may also refer to:

== Music ==
- WWW (album), 2013, by Kim Jaejoong
- "WWW", a 2002 song by Leningrad from Piraty XXI veka
- Woman Worldwide, a 2018 Justice remix album

== Film and television ==
- WWW - What a Wonderful World, a 2006 Moroccan film
- WWW (film), a 2021 Indian computer screen thriller film
- WWW (TV series), an Austrian children's series
- Invasion of the Dinosaurs (production code: WWW), a 1974 Doctor Who serial
- Search: WWW, a South Korean television series
- Willi wills wissen, a German children's series
- Wow! Wow! Wubbzy!, an animated American children's series

== Other uses ==
- WWW Trilogy, a trilogy of books
- Waterproof wristlet watch, a British military specification for a wristwatch
- World Three or WWW, an antagonistic group of characters in Mega Man Battle Network
- World Women's Wrestling, a New England, US based women's professional wrestling promotion
- Wawa language (ISO 639-3 code)
- Wolverine World Wide (NYSE ticker symbol)
- Wootton Wawen railway station (station code)
- Wimachtendienk Wingolauchsik Witahemui, former name of the Order of the Arrow
- World Wide Web Conference, an annual international academic conference
- World Weather Watch, system for recording and distribution of weather data, managed by the World Meteorological Organization

== See also ==
- DWWW, a Philippine radio station
- Rod Serling's Triple W: Witches, Warlocks and Werewolves
- VVVVVV, a puzzle-platform game
- 3W (disambiguation)
- W3 (disambiguation)
- Web (disambiguation)
- Wild Wild West (disambiguation)
- WW (disambiguation)
