= Kranji Marshes =

Nature reserve in Singapore

Coordinates: 1°25′00″N 103°43′43″E

- Kranji Marshes Park
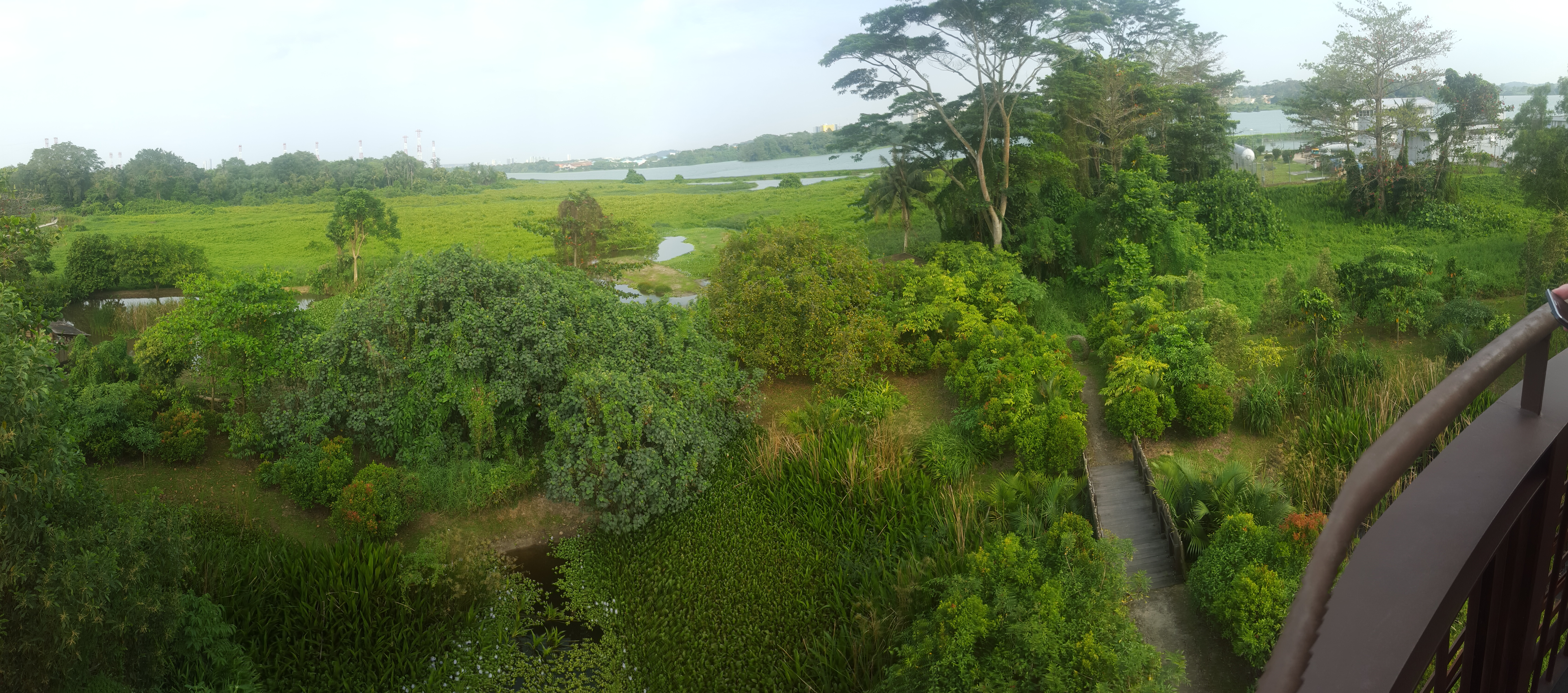
- Kranji marshes wetland reserve

- Location within Singapore
- Type: nature reserve
- Location: 11 Neo Tiew Lane 2, Singapore 718814
- Area: 54 hectares (540,000 m^{2})
- Opened: 1 February 2016; 10 years ago

The Kranji Marshes is a nature reserve in the northwest area of Singapore.

== Background ==
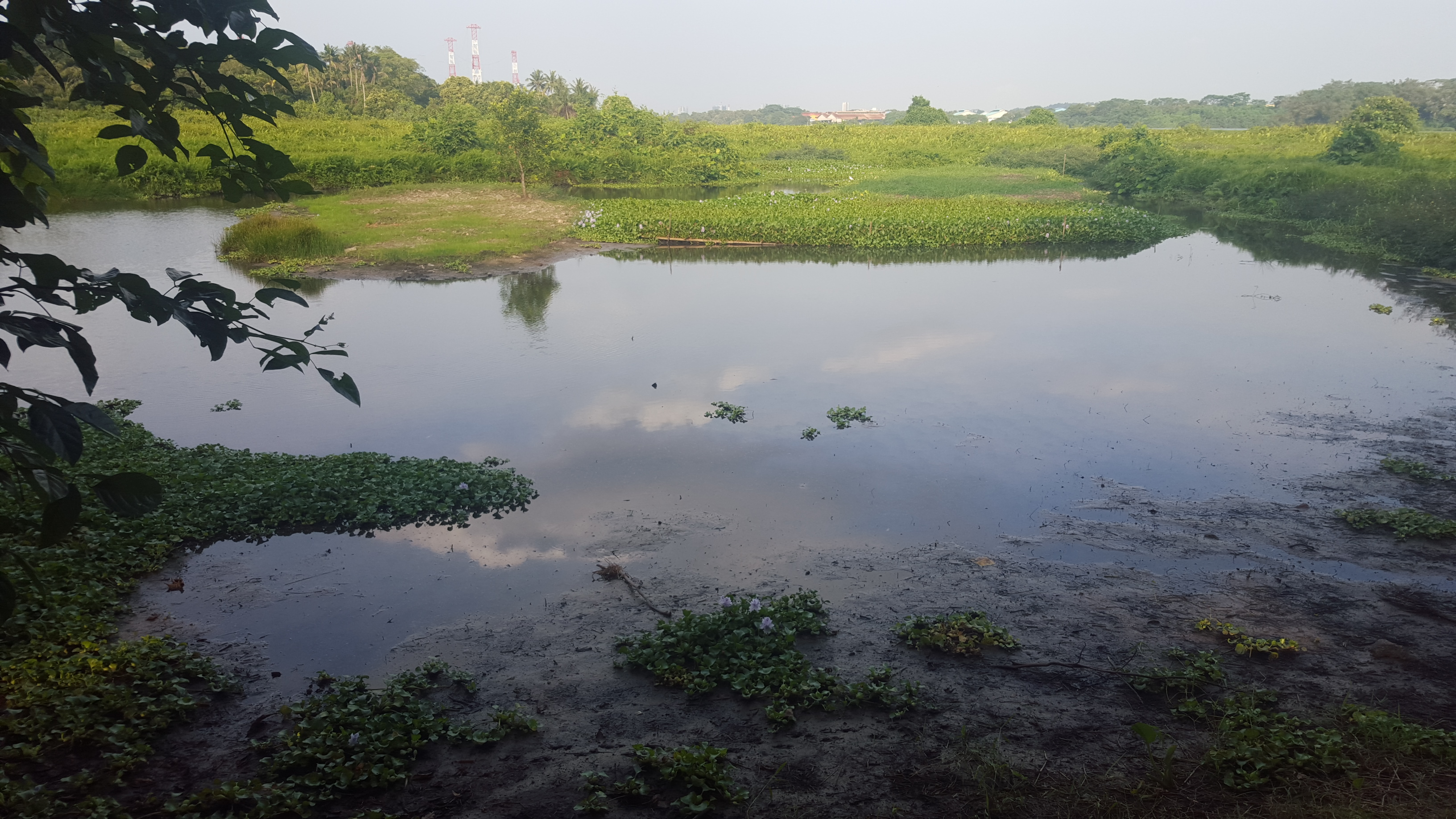
Kranji marshes wetland reserve, NW Singapore

A freshwater marshland, derived from the damming of the Kranji River to form the Kranji Reservoir, became seen as an important habitat. Nature Society Singapore (NSS) drafted a proposal highlighting its conservation value in 1990. This was accepted and included in the government Singapore Green Plan 1993. The 54-hectare site includes woodland and wetlands. NSS adopted the stretch of wetlands in 2008 and supported by sponsorship carried out a restoration program in cooperation with PUB and NParks. It was in 2005 that the area was recategorised as a park and named "Kranji Marshes Park". The parkland was opened to the public on 1 February 2016. The area is home to a number of endangered birds, and at least 170 species have been recorded.

== Getting there ==
The entrance to Kranji Marshes is at Neo Tiew Lane 2, and only accessible by car, bike or the Kranji Express which leaves every hour from 1200 to 1700 daily.

Service	Between	And	Notes
Kranji Express
KE	Kranji MRT station	Kranji Countryside	Visit www.kranjicountryside.com/template/schedule.html.
