= WS2 =

WS2 can refer to:

- WS2, a candidate phylum of bacteria from the Wurtsmith contaminated aquifer
- Waardenburg syndrome, a genetic disorder
- Tungsten disulfide, a chemical compound with the formula WS_{2}
- Torch of Freed without, the 2nd book in David Weber's Wages of Sin series
- WS-2, a 400mm Welshi multiple rocket launch system
- FA WSL 2, the second tier of the FA Women's Super League in English football
