= W2 =

W2, W-2, or w2 may refer to:

- W2 (tram), a class of electric trams built by the Melbourne & Metropolitan Tramways Board
- W2, one of four manuscripts of the Magnus Liber
- W2, a postcode district in the W postcode area of the United Kingdom
- w2 Concertzaal, a pop stage in 's-Hertogenbosch, The Netherlands
- W-2 tool steel, a water-hardening variety of high-carbon steel
- Apple W2, a wireless chip used in the Apple Watch Series 3
- Arado W 2, a two-seat twin-engine seaplane trainer
- British NVC community W2, a Woodland and scrub community in the British National Vegetation Classification system
- Form W-2, a United States federal tax form issued by employers and stating how much an employee was paid in a year
- The Vector W2, a concept car
- Wisconsin Works, a workforce development and welfare replacement program in Wisconsin (a form of Workfare)
- Perfect World (video game), also known as PW and World2, 3D MMORPG game
- Sri Lanka Railways W2, diesel-hydraulic locomotives
- Webster's New International Dictionary, Second Edition
- Third step of the W0-W6 scale for the classification of meteorites by weathering
- Windows 2.0x, a Microsoft operating system

== See also ==
- 2W (disambiguation)
- W3 (disambiguation)
