= 2W =

2W or 2-W may refer to,

- 2nd meridian west, a longitude coordinate
- OR 2W; see U.S. Route 30 in Oregon
- SD40-2W, a model of EMD SD40-2 locomotive
- GP38-2W, a model of EMD GP38-2 locomotive
- GP40-2W, a model of EMD GP40-2 locomotive
- AF-2W, a model of Grumman AF Guardian
- SLC-2W, a designation for Vandenberg AFB Space Launch Complex 2
- Welcome Air's IATA code
- BBC 2W, a former digital television channel in Wales
- A two-wire telecommunication circuit
- Tropical Depression 02W; see Typhoon Isa (1997)

== See also ==
- W2 (disambiguation)
