= ES Power Singapore =

Electricity retailing service in Singapore

- Industry: Electricity Retailing
- Founders: Sivakumar Avadiar, Quek Leng Chuang
- Headquarters: Singapore
- Area served: Singapore
- Products: Singapore
- Number of employees: Approximately 50
- Parent: Environmental Solutions (Asia) Pte. Ltd.
- Website: http://www.env-solutions.com

ES Power is an electricity retailing service started by Environmental Solutions (Asia) Pte. Ltd. in 2016. ES Power was the first electricity service in Singapore to offer complete carbon offset to its customer for their electricity. Carbon offsets are given through carbon credits which, in turn, are used to invest in non-renewable energy related projects around the globe, especially in developing countries. ES Power has since been re-branded as ES Living and focuses more on the environmental attributes.

== History ==
Environmental Solutions (Asia) Pte. Ltd. was founded in 1999, and its headquarters is located in Singapore. The company's business is mainly in harvesting base and precious metals from spent resources as an alternative to mining.

ES Power received retail electricity license from Energy Market Authority (EMA) to provide electricity to consumers in an open market in 2016 and started providing contracts in the initial phased roll-out of the open market. In an effort to give consumers more options to manage their electricity costs, since 2001 EMA has progressively opened the electricity market to competitors. Previously consumers were bound to purchase electricity from SP Services (SPS). In June 2019, iSwitch took over all of ES Power's contracts for S$15 million.
