= W3 =

W3 or W-3 may refer to:

- W3 (tram), a class of electric trams built by the Melbourne & Metropolitan Tramways Board
- W3, a postcode district in the W postcode area
- Apple W3, a wireless chip used in the Apple Watch Series 4.
- PZL W-3 Sokół, a Polish helicopter
- The Amazing 3, a manga and anime series, known in Japan as Wonder 3
- Arik Air, which has IATA code W3
- The fourth step of the W0-W6 scale for the classification of meteorites by weathering
- The U.S. Internal Revenue Service form W-3, a transmittal form for Form W-2 information
- Webster's Third New International Dictionary, the 1961 edition of Webster's Dictionary
- The World Wide Web, abbreviated 'W3' on the earliest web pages
- World Wide Web Consortium, international standards organization for the World Wide Web (abbreviated WWW or W3)
- Windows 3.0, a Microsoft operating system
- London Buses route W3

== Video games ==
- Warcraft III: Reign of Chaos, the third game in the Warcraft series.
- Worms & Reinforcements United, a game bundle composing the first Worms game and the Worms Reinforcements expansion pack
- Wiedźmin 3: Dziki Gon, the original name of the Polish video game The Witcher 3: Wild Hunt

== See also ==
- WWW (disambiguation)
- 3W (disambiguation)
- 3 (disambiguation)
- W (disambiguation)
- Web development tools
