= Christopher L. Magee =

American engineer and researcher

- Born: Pittsburgh, Pennsylvania
- Occupations: Mechanical engineer, academic, and researcher
- Awards: Alfred Nobel Award for the outstanding research contribution William Hunt Eisenman Award by ASM

Academic background
- Education: B.Sc., Metallurgy and Materials Science; M.Sc., Metallurgy and Materials Science; Ph.D., Metallurgy and Materials Science; MBA, Advanced Management
- Alma mater: Carnegie Institute of Technology; Michigan State University
- Doctoral advisor: H.W. Paxton

Academic work
- Institutions: Massachusetts Institute of Technology; TechNext Inc.

Christopher L. Magee is an American mechanical engineer, academic and researcher. He is Professor of the practice Emeritus in Mechanical Engineering Department and Institute for Data, Systems and Society at Massachusetts Institute of Technology. He co-directs the International Design Center of Singapore University of Technology and Design.

Magee's research expertise lies in vehicle design, technological change, systems engineering, vehicle crashworthiness and computer-aided design. He has also worked on the application of materials, vehicle crashworthiness, manufacturing product interface and the aspects of the product development process. His later research is focused on complex systems and engineering education.

== Education ==
Magee received his Bachelors, Masters and Doctoral degrees in Metallurgy and Materials Science from Carnegie Institute of Technology. In 1979, he completed his MBA in Advanced Management from Michigan State University.

== Career ==
After completing his Ph.D. studies in 1966, Magee joined Ford Motor Company as a research scientist and development engineer till 1976. In the following eight years, he managed various research departments before being promoted to Director of Vehicle Concepts Research lab for a six-year term. From 1990 till 1998, Magee directed the Vehicle Systems Engineering at the company. He was promoted to Executive Director of Program and Advanced Engineering from 1998 till 1999 and served as an Executive Director of Ford/MIT Strategic Technical Partnership from 2000 till 2001.

In 2002, Magee left Ford Motor Company and was appointed by Massachusetts Institute of Technology as Professor of the practice in Mechanical Engineering Department and Institute for Data, Systems and Society (IDSS).

In 2011, Magee was appointed as the co-director of SUTD/MIT International Design Center at the International Design Center of Singapore University of Technology and Design.

== Research ==
Magee has conducted research focusing on vehicle design, systems engineering and computer-aided engineering. He has worked on the application of materials, vehicle crashworthiness, manufacturing product interface and the product development process. He has also worked on quantification of technological performance trends, design and invention methodological research, theory of technological change, patent networks, patent metrics and quantitative understanding of technological performance.

=== Research on Ferrous materials ===
Magee worked on the transformation, structure and strength of ferrous materials in the late 1960s and early 1970s. His work on ferrous materials received international recognition and he was awarded the Howe Medal and the Alfred Nobel Award. He investigated the low temperature deformation of newly transformed martensitic alloys, identifying and quantifying a new deformation mode -transformation plasticity - known as the Magee mechanism. His quantitative study of martensite formation included an analytical model of transformation at various temperatures known as the Magee equation.

Magee found that the weight percentage of carbon in the alloys determined the deformation in both the lenticular-tetragonal and packet-cubic martensites. His research identified the meaningful suppression of twinning in higher carbon cubic martensites and with D. W. Hoffman theoretically explained this effect.

=== Vehicle crashworthiness ===
Magee has contributed significantly to the research area of vehicle crashworthiness. He published an article in the 1970s with P H. Thornton about the design considerations in energy absorption by structural collapse. They developed a general treatment, encompassing both the geometry and material properties of the structure, for the absorption of mechanical energy due to axial collapse of structural shapes.

In a separate study, Magee and Thornton found that the energy absorbing efficiency was independent of foam density while being an important function of alloy and heat treatments. Magee proposed an explanation for the increase in efficiency and discussed the constant-stress collapse process. Magee and R. G. Davies conducted research on the effect of strain-rate on the tensile deformation of materials and found the variable effects, regarding the stress-strain behavior, in various materials having aluminum alloys.

=== Later research ===
Magee's later research is focused on theories of technological change, including use of design and invention models to explain differences in rates of technological performance change. He presented a model based on the inventive design process that also provided an explanatory foundation for the phenomena of exponential time dependence of functional technical performance.

One of Magee's later research interests include innovation and technology development in complex systems. He presented a method for the quantitative assessment of role of materials innovation in overall technological innovation. He conducted an empirical study to explore the relationship between technological improvement and diffusion of innovation. His research findings showed that technological improvement does not decline in the latter part of diffusion.

In 2020, Magee and MIT researcher Anuraag Singh, created a search engine that can predict the improvement rates of about 1,757 different technologies, they later formalised their research and formed TechNext.ai, an AI company that provides quantitative forecasts for technology.

== Awards and honors ==
Magee has received several best paper awards. In 1997, he was elected a member of the National Academy of Engineering for contributions to advanced vehicle development. He is also a Henry Ford Technical Fellow.

Awards include:

- 1972: Alfred Nobel Award for the outstanding research contribution by a member of the five Founding Engineering Societies
- 1972: Henry Marion Howe Medal, ASM
- 2001: William Hunt Eisenman Award, ASM
- 2004: INCOSE Conference, best paper award, with Olivier de Weck, for their paper "An Attempt to Assess Complexity of Engineering Systems"
- 2006: Elsevier Award for Best Paper in Technological Forecasting and Social Change, with Heebyung Koh, for paper "A Functional Approach for Studying Technological Progress: Application to Information Technology"

== Publications ==
Magee has published numerous research papers and is the co-author of two books:

=== Books ===
- Engineering Systems: Meeting Human Needs in a Complex Technological World (2011) ISBN 978-0262529945
- Exponential Change; What Drives it? What does it tell us about the Future? (2014)

=== Selected articles ===
- Singh, Anuraag; Triulzi, Giorgio; Magee, Christopher L. (2021). "Technological improvement rate predictions for all technologies: Use of patent data and an extended domain description". Research Policy. 50 (9) 104294. arXiv:2004.13919. doi:10.1016/j.respol.2021.104294. ISSN 0048-7333.
- Triulzi, Giorgio; Alstott, Jeff; Magee, Christopher L. (2020). "Estimating technology performance improvement rates by mining patent data". Technological Forecasting and Social Change. 158 120100. doi:10.1016/j.techfore.2020.120100.
- Woo, Jongroul; Magee, Christopher L. (2020). "Forecasting the value of battery electric vehicles compared to internal combustion engine vehicles: The influence of driving range and battery technology". International Journal of Energy Research. 44 (8): 6483–6501. arXiv:1806.06947. Bibcode:2020IJER...44.6483W. doi:10.1002/er.5382. S2CID 49316956.
- Feng, Sida; Magee, Christopher L. (2020). "Technological development of key domains in electric vehicles: Improvement rates, technology trajectories and key assignees". Applied Energy. 260 114264. Bibcode:2020ApEn..26014264F. doi:10.1016/j.apenergy.2019.114264. S2CID 213637883.
- Sharifzadeh, Mahdi; Triulzi, Giorgio; Magee, Christopher L. (2019). "Quantification of technological progress in greenhouse gas (GHG) capture and mitigation using patent data". Energy & Environmental Science. 12 (9): 2789–2805. Bibcode:2019EnEnS..12.2789S. doi:10.1039/c9ee01526d. hdl:1992/47108. S2CID 199642269.
- Benson, Christopher L.; Triulzi, Giorgio; Magee, Christopher L. (2018). "Is There a Moore's Law for 3D Printing?". 3D Printing and Additive Manufacturing. 5: 53–62. doi:10.1089/3dp.2017.0041. hdl:1992/47053.
