= Henry Ford Technical Fellow =

In 1994, Ford Motor Company created the position of Henry Ford Technical Fellow. This appointment is the most prestigious technical leadership position in the Company. It is intended to recognize exceptional engineers and scientists in research, product development, quality, information technology and manufacturing. It also recognizes their contributions as top technical experts with a national/international reputation in a key automotive related field. Fellows provide technical expertise, guidance and leadership in the application of relevant engineering and/or scientific principles to product development, manufacturing, smart mobility, information technology, data and analytics, and other areas of the business on technical matters. They also play a major consultative role to the senior leadership of the company in the development of corporate technical strategy and plans, and serve as champions of the Technical Specialist Program in the Company. To date, there have been 19 individuals appointed as a Henry Ford Technical Fellow.

- 1994: Dr. Rodney Edwards - Vehicle Prototyping
- 1994: Dr. Haren S. Gandhi - Automotive Exhaust Catalysts
- 1994: Dr. Wallace R. Wade - Powertrain Engineering
- 1995: Dr. Priyaranjan Prasad - Biomechanics and Automotive Safety
- 1995: Louis R. Ross - Vehicle Engineering
- 1996: Dr. Christopher L. Magee - Systems Engineering
- 1997: Prof. Dr. Werner Kalkert - Powertrain Engineering
- 1998: Richard Riff - C3P Technology
- 1999: Prof. Dr. Rodney J. Tabaczynski - ICE Pollution Control
- 2001: Dr. Timothy P. Davis - Quality Engineering
- 2002: Dr. Takeshi Abe - Vehicle Driving Dynamics
- 2006: Dr. Davor Hrovat - Automotive Control Systems
- 2010: James Buczkowski - Electrical and Electronics Systems
- 2013: Dr. Mike Tamor - Hybrid Vehicles and Fuel Cells
- 2017: Dr. Dimitar Filev - Intelligent Information & Control Systems
- 2021: Dr. Debbie Mielewski - Advanced Materials
- 2022: Dr. Anthony D. Cooprider - Electrical and Electronic Systems Integrity
- 2022: Dr. Cynthia Flanigan - Sustainability Engineering
- 2023: Prof. Dr. Vasiliy Krivtsov - Probabilistic Risk Assessment
- 2025: Peter Kuechler - Vehicle Energy and Propulsive Systems
