= Woodrow Wilson Teaching Fellowship =

The Woodrow Wilson Teaching Fellowship (WW Teaching Fellowship) is a program of the Woodrow Wilson National Fellowship Foundation that recruits, supports, and prepares individuals for teaching careers, typically in fields of science, technology, engineering, and mathematics (STEM).

President Barack Obama cited the Woodrow Wilson Teaching Fellowship as a model of STEM teacher preparation in a January 2010 speech on his administration's "Educate to Innovate" initiative.

== History ==
In 2007, the Woodrow Wilson Foundation began to focus on the closing of achievement gap, both at the K-12 level and also for institutions of higher education.

According to studies by various researchers and organizations, improvement in teacher expertise is the best way to improve student achievement, and teacher preparation is an important factor in improving learning outcomes.

Based on these findings, the Foundation created the Woodrow Wilson Teaching Fellowship program. Teacher candidates who are graduating from or have graduated from college, including graduating college seniors, recent graduates, and midcareer or second-career professionals, are selected to receive fellowships of approximately $30,000, which they use to enroll in master's degree programs for teacher preparation at universities selected by the Foundation. They teach at associated local public secondary schools from the beginning of their master's work. In exchange for the Fellowship, Woodrow Wilson Teaching Fellows commit to teach in high-need urban or rural schools for three years. During the three-year period they receive ongoing mentoring from both their university and the school district in which they are placed.

=== The Leonore Annenberg Teaching Fellowship ===
The first Woodrow Wilson Teaching Fellowship, called the Leonore Annenberg Teaching Fellowship, was created in 2007 with funding from the Annenberg Foundation. Its Fellows enroll in master's-level teacher preparation at four selected national universities—Stanford University and the Universities of Pennsylvania, Virginia, and Washington. Each of the four universities conducts its own application and admissions process, with review by the Woodrow Wilson Foundation.

=== State-based Woodrow Wilson Teaching Fellowships ===
In late 2007, the foundation launched the Woodrow Wilson Indiana Teaching Fellowship. Supported by Lilly Endowment, the WW Indiana Teaching Fellowship focuses on STEM teaching, recruiting 80 Fellows per year to attend teacher preparation programs at Ball State University, IUPUI, Purdue University, and the University of Indianapolis. IUPUI and the University of Indianapolis prepare teachers for Indianapolis-area schools—while Ball State works with the Muncie and Anderson schools and Purdue prepares teachers specifically for a network of rural Indiana schools.

The next states to create Woodrow Wilson Teaching Fellowships, Michigan and Ohio, launched their programs in late 2009 and 2010, respectively. The first classes of Fellows in these states begin their studies in summer 2011.

The W.K. Kellogg Foundation's Woodrow Wilson Michigan Teaching Fellowship, works with six universities: Eastern Michigan University, Grand Valley State University, Michigan State University, University of Michigan, Wayne State University, and Western Michigan University. Partner school districts include Battle Creek, Benton Harbor, Detroit, Grand Rapids, and Kalamazoo.

The Woodrow Wilson Ohio Teaching Fellowship, supported by the Ohio Board of Regents’ Choose Ohio First program, with additional funds from a statewide group of private philanthropies, works with John Carroll University, Ohio State University, the University of Akron, and the University of Cincinnati. Partnering Ohio districts include Akron, Canton, Cincinnati, Cleveland, and Columbus.

Like the Indiana program, the Fellowships in Michigan and Ohio programs focus specifically on preparing teachers in the STEM fields for high-need secondary schools in their states.

Georgia institutions Columbus State University, Kennesaw State University and Piedmont College are also hosting Woodrow Wilson Teaching Fellows.

=== The Woodrow Wilson-Rockefeller Brothers Fund (WW-RBF) Fellowship for Aspiring Teachers of Color ===
Created by the Rockefeller Brothers Fund in 1992, the WW-RBF Fellowship was transferred to the Woodrow Wilson Foundation in 2009. The program works to recruit, support, and retain individuals of color as K-12 public school teachers in the United States. Fellows must use their awards for master's programs at one of 27 teacher preparation programs designated by the Woodrow Wilson Foundation.
