= WS =

WS, Ws, or ws may refer to:

== Businesses and organizations ==
- Ware Shoals Railroad (reporting mark WS), South Carolina, United States
- WestJet (IATA airline code WS)
- Society of Writers to His Majesty's Signet, in post-nomial abbreviation (WS Society)
- Williams Street, the production arm for Cartoon Network’s nighttime programming block, Adult Swim
- Warm Showers, a non-profit hospitality exchange network for world cyclists.
- Williams-Sonoma, Inc., American kitchenware and home furnishings retailer.
- Wikisource, an online digital library of free-content textual sources on a wiki

== Places ==
- WS postcode area, West Midlands, UK
- Samoa (ISO 3166-1 country code WS)
- Washington state (United States)
- Winschoten railway station, the Netherlands, station code
- Winston-Salem, North Carolina, United States

== Science and technology ==
- .ws, the Internet country code top-level domain for Samoa
- WebSocket URI scheme, e.g. ws://example.com
- Watt second (Ws) or Joule, a unit of energy
- Web service, software system designed to support machine-to-machine interaction over the Web
- Werner syndrome, premature aging
- White striping, a condition in poultry where fat replaces muscle
- Williams syndrome, a developmental disorder
- WonderSwan, handheld game console

== Sports ==
- World Sailing, world governing body for the sport of sailing
- The World Series, the annual championship series of Major League Baseball postseason
- World Series (disambiguation)

== Others ==
- Winter Semester in German Academic Year

== See also ==
- The W's, a 1990s Christian swing band
- WS FTP, a File Transfer Protocol client
