= Fauna of Singapore =

Animal species in Singapore

Singapore has about 65 species of mammals, 390 species of birds, 110 species of reptiles, 30 species of amphibians, more than 300 butterfly species, 127 dragonfly species, and over 2,000 recorded species of marine wildlife.

The Central Catchment Nature Reserve and the nearby Bukit Timah Nature Reserve are the stronghold of the remaining forest animals on the mainland. These enclose the only remnants of primary forest on the island. The former includes four reservoirs (MacRitchie, Upper Peirce, Lower Peirce, and Upper Seletar). The northeastern offshore islands of Pulau Ubin and Pulau Tekong are also rich in wildlife.

Other notable areas are Sungei Buloh Wetland Reserve, Singapore Botanic Gardens, Bukit Batok Nature Park, and Pulau Semakau.

== Fauna ==
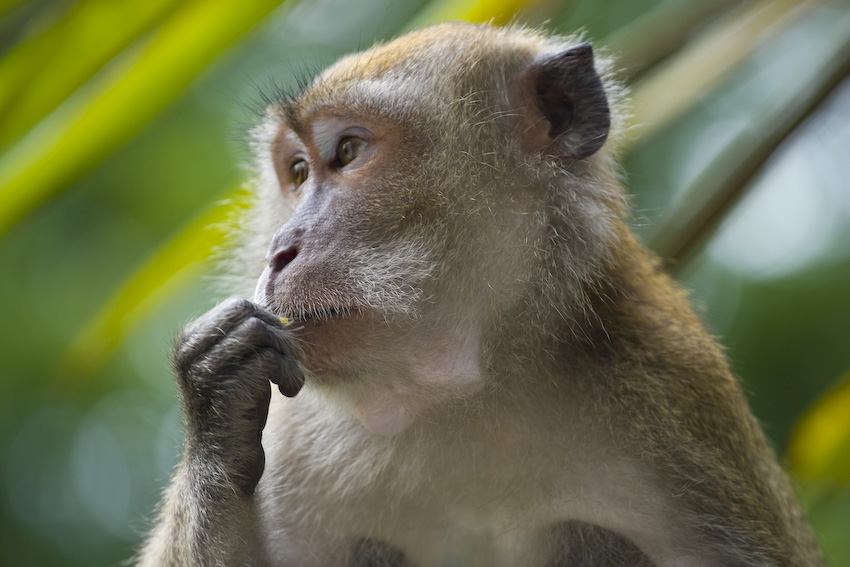
Mammals
(Macaca fascicularis)

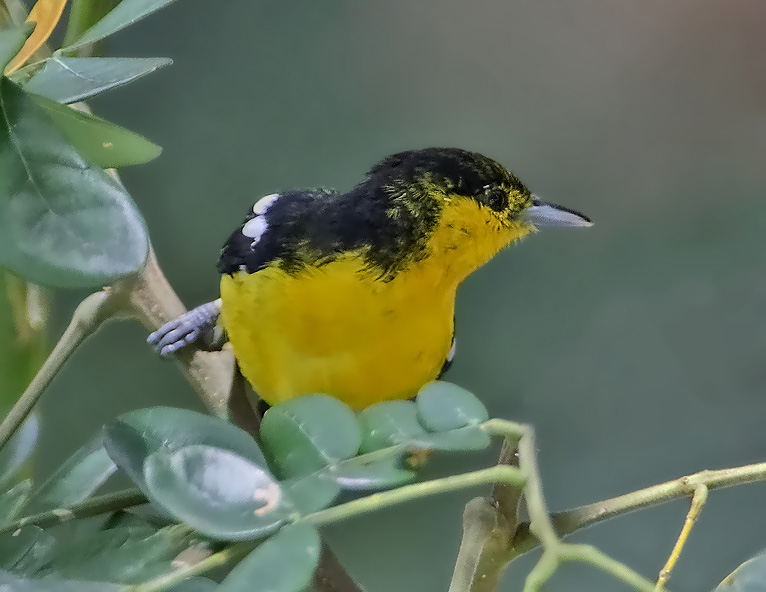
Birds
(Aegithina tiphia )

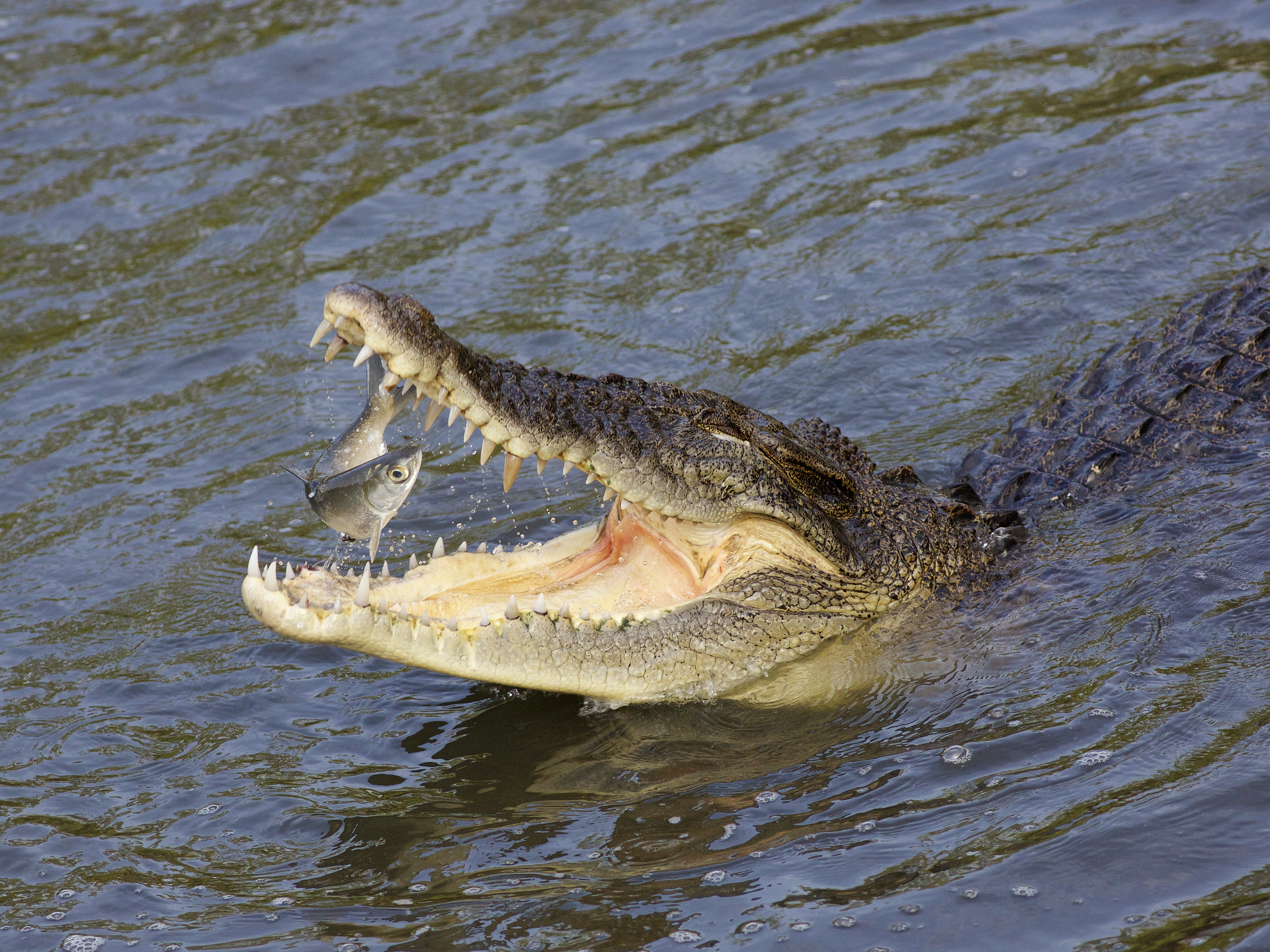
Reptiles
(saltwater crocodile)

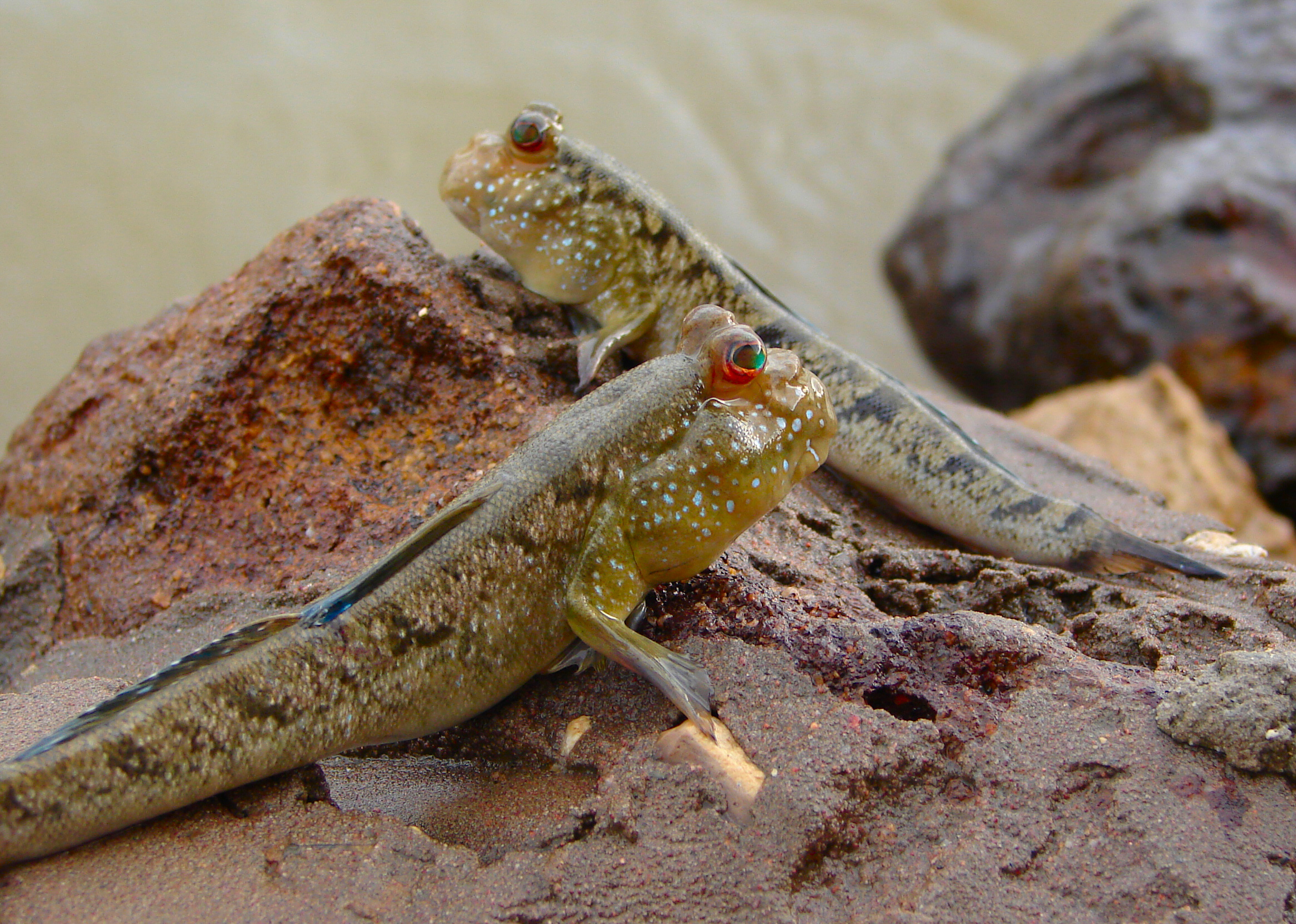
Fish
(Gambian mudskipper)

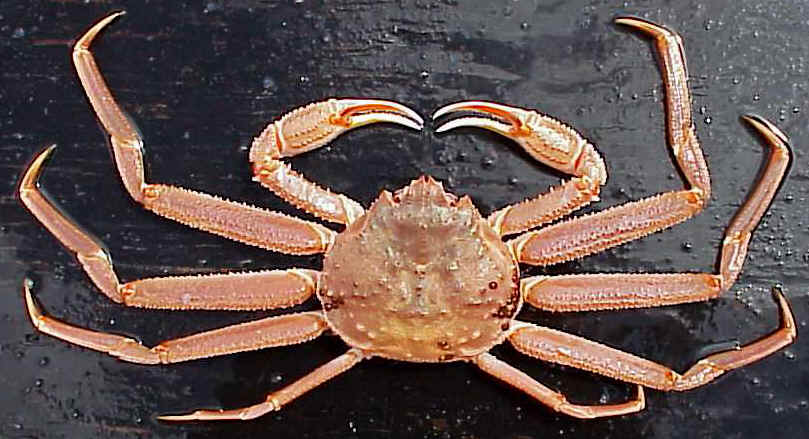
Crabs
(Chionoecetes bairdi)
- Mammals
- Birds
- Reptiles
- Amphibians
- Fish
- Invertebrates

== Nature areas ==
- Admiralty Park
- Bidadari Cemetery
- Bukit Batok Nature Park
- Bukit Brown Cemetery
- Bukit Timah Nature Reserve
- Central Catchment Nature Reserve
- Changi Reclaimed Land
- Choa Chu Kang Cemetery
- Dairy Farm Nature Park
- Coney Island
- Jurong Lake
- Kusu Island
- Labrador Nature Reserve
- Lorong Halus
- Neo Tiew Lane
- Pasir Ris Park
- Pulau Hantu
- Pulau Semakau
- Pulau Tekong
- Pulau Ubin
- Sentosa
- Singapore Botanic Gardens
- Sisters' Islands
- Southern Ridges
- St. John Island
- Sungei Buloh Wetland Reserve
- Sungei Punggol
- Sungei Serangoon
- Tampines Eco Green
- Tuas
- West Coast Park
- Western Water Catchment

== See also ==
- Flora of Singapore
- Urban-wildlife interactions in Singapore
- National Parks Board
- Wildlife of Singapore
