= Flora of Singapore =

Plant species of Singapore

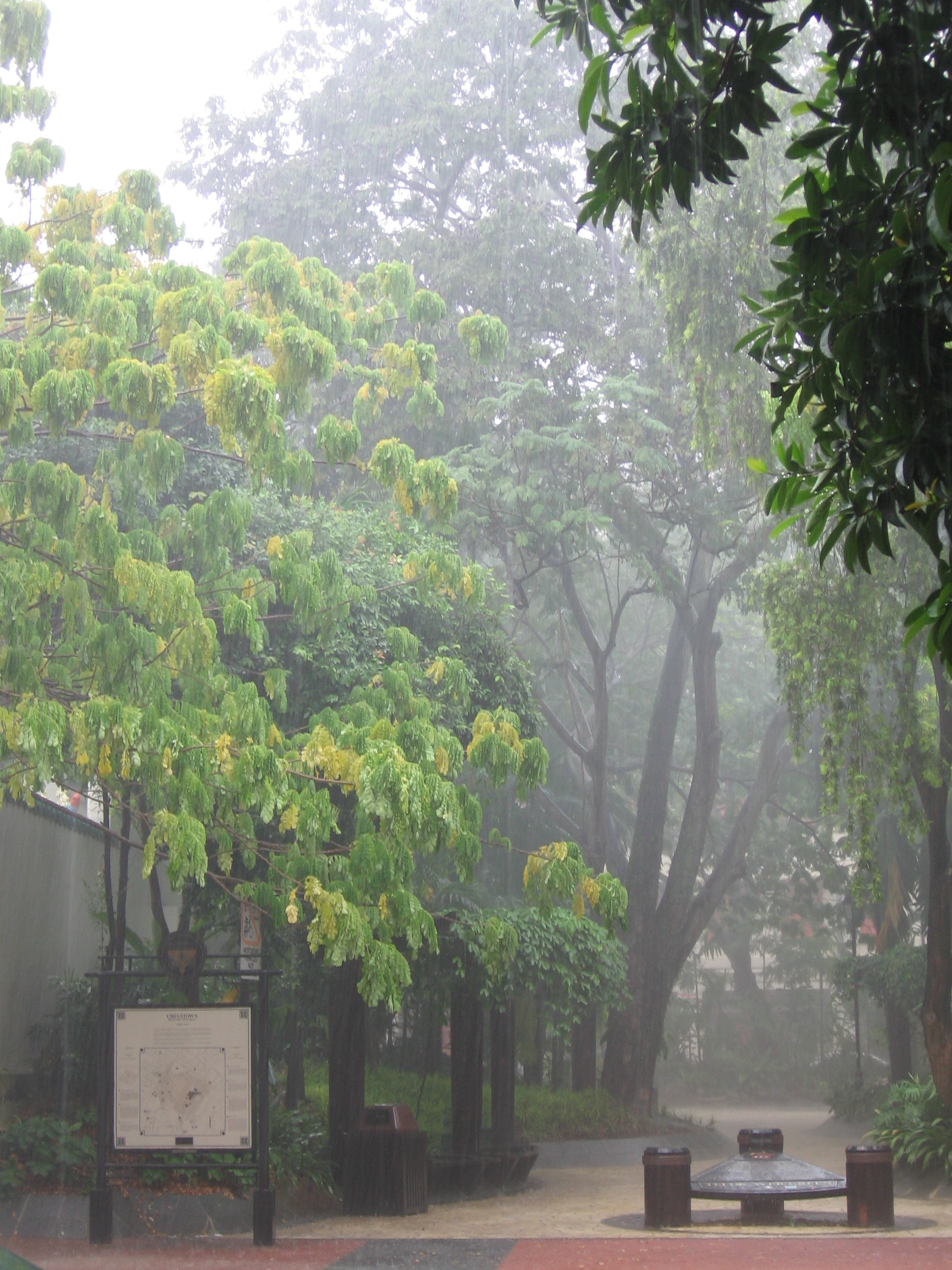
Trees in a park

Singapore has a wide variety of flora. Plants are mainly used to beautify the landscape of Singapore. The national flower is a hybrid orchid, Vanda Miss Joaquim.

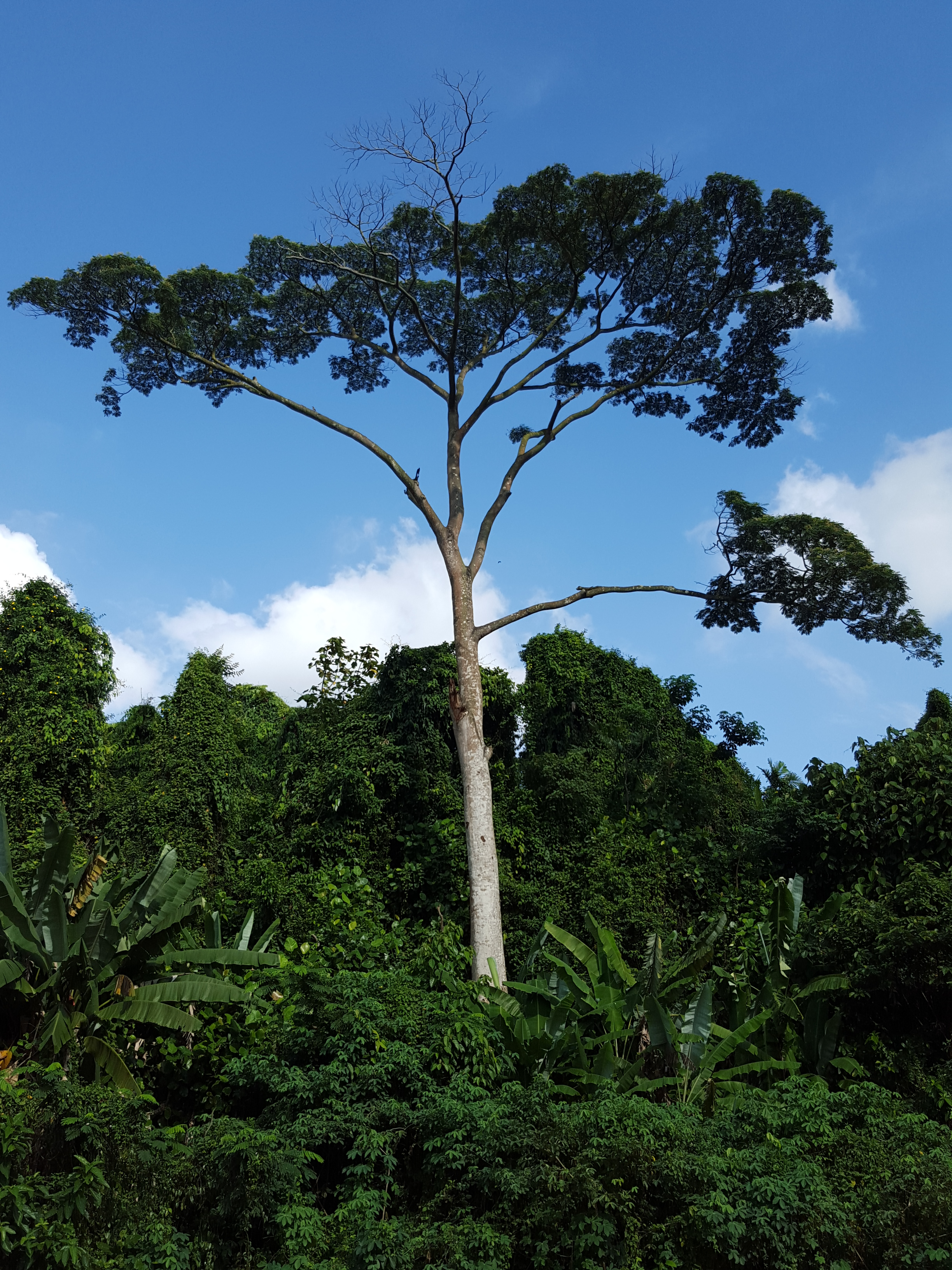
Large tropical tree

As in any tropical rainforest Singapore is home to a number of very large trees from the families Apocynaceae, Dipterocarpaceae, Fabaceae, Malvaceae and others. A number of these thrive reasonably, but for the large Shorea gratissima there is a problem - its seeds will not germinate, and the reason for this is not known.

There is also a fair number of palm species. In the forest understorey is found a number of common houseplants such as Epipremnum aureum, Monstera and Dieffenbachia.

On the many large trees are found many epiphytes, including several types of ferns like Asplenium, and many orchids such as Dendrobium crumenatum.

== Places exhibiting the flora of Singapore ==
- Singapore Botanic Gardens
- Sungei Buloh Wetland Reserve
- Gardens by the Bay

== Events related to the flora of Singapore ==
- Singapore Garden Festival

== Programs related to the flora of Singapore ==
- Singapore Green Plan 2012 - Drawn up in 2002, the Singapore Green Plan 2012 (SGP2012) is a 10-year national blueprint to build a sustainable environment for the upcoming generations.
- 'Community In Bloom' Programme - Encouraging the community to cultivate on common green areas to create gardens for all to enjoy.
- The Singing Forest - A new collection of bird-attracting native trees is being established at Southern Ridges to provide a wide variety of suitable food sources as well as shelter and nesting areas for native birds. When established, the additional planting of suitable tree species will eventually provide an opportunity for visitors to learn and appreciate the diverse collection of birds and trees. This project is sponsored by ST Microelectronics.
- Nature Keeper Programme - The Nature Keeper Programme is the first programme for primary school students which focuses on our local forests and its floral and faunal inhabitants. Designed to stimulate the interest of the young and inculcate in them an appreciation of our forests, the programme brings students through a series of theoretical and field workshops on eight topics that will be carried out over two years. It will be carried out at the Bukit Timah and Central Catchment Nature Reserves. The programme also aims to nurture young volunteers in protecting our natural heritage in the longer term.
- Sembcorp Forests of Giants - Sembcorp Industries has donated $1 million to the Garden City Fund to set up an arboretum - a living gallery of giant tree species - for education and research, and to fund green educational programmes to benefit the community. This is part of efforts to enhance biodiversity within urban areas.
- Plant a Tree Programme and Orchid Conservation Fund - The Orchid Conservation Fund was launched by the Garden City Fund and the Institute of Public Character (IPC) to raise $250,000 to help conserve native orchids. Donations to this fund are used to propagate and reintroduce our rare and endangered orchid species back into the roads, parks and nature areas. The Plant a Tree programme was conceptualised by the Garden City Fund, in partnership with the Singapore Environment Council, to provide an avenue for individuals and organisations to do their part for nature through planting of trees at designated parks and nature reserves.

== Cultural significance ==
The national flower of Singapore is Papilionanthe Miss Joaquim, also known as Vanda Miss Joaquim or the Singapore orchid. For its resilience and year-round blooming quality, it was chosen on 15 April 1981 to represent Singapore's uniqueness and hybrid culture.

== See also ==
- Fauna of Singapore
- Wildlife of Singapore
- Urban-wildlife interactions in Singapore
- National Biodiversity Centre
