= Junk Island =

Junk Island may refer to:

- Pulau Jong, an island in Singapore
- Fat Tong Chau, a former island in Hong Kong
- Junk, a tiny island near Hoy, Shetland in Scotland
