= Agri-Food and Veterinary Authority of Singapore =

Former statutory board in Singapore

Agency overview
- Formed: 1 April 2000; 26 years ago
- Preceding agency: Primary Production Department (PPD)
- Dissolved: 1 April 2019; 7 years ago
- Superseding agencies: Singapore Food Agency (SFA); National Parks Board (NParks)
- Jurisdiction: Government of Singapore
- Headquarters: 52 Jurong Gateway Road, #14-01, Singapore 608550
- Annual budget: S$125.75 million (2014)
- Agency executives: Lim Neo Chian, Chairman; Lim Kok Thai, CEO
- Parent agency: Ministry of National Development
- Website: www.ava.gov.sg
- Agency ID: T08GB0003K

The Agri-Food and Veterinary Authority of Singapore (AVA) was a statutory board under the Ministry of National Development that regulated food safety, safeguarded animal and plant health, and facilitated the agri-food and fisheries trade sectors. AVA was disbanded on 1 April 2019, with duties being transferred to other statutory boards, Singapore Food Agency, National Environment Agency, Health Sciences Authority, and National Parks Board.

== History ==
In June 1959, the agriculture, co-operatives, fisheries, rural development and veterinary divisions of various ministries were reshuffled to form the Primary Production Department, under the new Ministry of National Development. The department was restructured into a statutory board, the Agri-Food and Veterinary Authority, on 1 April 2000. The Food Control Division (formerly part of the Ministry of the Environment) was added to the AVA in July 2002. It regulated food safety, safeguarded animal and plant health, and facilitated the agri-food and fisheries trade sectors.

AVA was disbanded on 1 April 2019 with its food related duties absorbed by Singapore Food Agency (SFA) which also absorbed the duties of two other statutory boards namely National Environment Agency (NEA) and Health Sciences Authority (HSA). All non-food plant and animal-related functions of the AVA were transferred to the National Parks Board (NParks) under Animal and Veterinary Service (AVS). SFA is a stat board under the Ministry of the Environment and Water Resources.

== Functions ==
The components of AVA's food safety system includes:

- Review of production systems and practices at source,
- Risk assessment and the setting of food safety and food labelling standards,
- Tagging of consignments of primary produce to trace sources, and food labelling to facilitate recall,
- Inspection of primary produce and processed food at the points of entry into Singapore,
- Pre and post-slaughter inspections at local abattoirs,
- Inspection and accreditation of source farms, abattoirs, food-processing factories, both local and overseas,
- Monitoring and surveillance programmes for food-borne hazards in primary and processed food,
- Laboratory testing capabilities for detecting and analysing pathogens and chemical contaminants in livestock, frozen and chilled meat, live and chilled fish, vegetables, fruits, eggs and processed food,
- Promoting the adoption of good agricultural and manufacturing practices, and food safety assurance systems by the food industry,
- Close rapport with other national authorities,
- Close monitoring of world situation for developments in food safety and potential threats.

The food safety system is backed up by enforcement of food safety standards through a legal framework as well as through food safety public education on the collective responsibility of AVA, the food industry and the public in ensuring food safety.

== Ensuring resilience in food supply ==
AVA helps to provide Singapore with an adequate and stable supply of food. It achieves this by diversifying the sources of supply to Singapore through efforts in the following areas:

- Approving new sources for importation of food by the private sector,
- Participating in trade missions to seek out new sources,
- Collaborating with the private sector, such as through AVA's agri-food Business Clusters in food sourcing.

Singapore's local farms provide a small measure of the nation's vegetables, fish and egg supply. AVA helps local farms to optimise their production by assisting them to employ intensive farming systems and safe food production practices.

On 19 May 2015 AVA stated that so far they had not received any feedback about fake rice, made of plastic.

== Safeguarding animal and plant health ==
The AVA works to ensure that Singapore is free from exotic animal and plant health diseases.

=== Animal health ===
As the national authority for animal health, AVA administers a programme to prevent the introduction of animal diseases.

The programme entails:

- Regulating the import of animals and their products, and implementing quarantine measures to prevent the introduction and spread of animal diseases in Singapore,
- Carrying out animal disease surveillance programmes to detect and control animal diseases,
- Providing services for the diagnosis, treatment and prevention of animal diseases,
- Facilitating Singapore's international trade through export health certification,
- Emergency preparedness to detect exotic animal diseases early and implementing eradication and control measures to stop the transmission of such diseases in Singapore.

=== Plant protection ===
To safeguard the health of plants in Singapore, AVA administers a programme to control or prevent the incursion of diseases and pests.

The plant health programme includes:

- Regulating and inspecting imported plants and plant products and implementing quarantine and surveillance programmes to prevent the introduction and establishment of plant pests and diseases in Singapore,
- Providing services for the control of exotic and endemic plant diseases and pests to protect the plant trade and industry, and the environment,
- Certification of export plants and plant products for freedom from pests and diseases.

=== Safeguarding animal welfare ===
The AVA safeguards the welfare of animals in Singapore by enforcing regulations to protect animals against cruel treatment and educating the public on responsible pet ownership. The Responsible Pet Ownership Public Education Programme was launched in 2004 to attain the two objectives of promoting responsible pet ownership and to tackle the strays issue. Working closely with animal welfare organisations, AVA aims to drive home the message of "A Pet is for Life".

== Promoting agrotechnology ==
The challenge of maximising productivity from limited agricultural land and sea is addressed by agro-technology and agri-biotechnology. By providing technical expertise and consultancy services, AVA is making investments in new sources of food supply for Singapore.

== Investment in research and development ==
AVA engage in R&D projects on production systems, breeding, nutrition, disease control, aquaculture and vegetable production. AVA develops testing capabilities to detect food contaminants, food pathogens and animal and plant diseases. AVA works in collaboration with institutes of higher learning, research centres like the Institute of Molecular Agrobiology, Temasek Life Sciences Laboratory, the Tropical Marine Sciences Institute, and the private sector.

== Protecting endangered wildlife ==
The AVA protects wildlife by controlling their trade and preventing their exploitation. AVA have been appointed as the national authority responsible for the implementation and enforcement of the Convention on International Trade in Endangered Species of Wild Fauna and Flora (CITES).
