= Health Sciences Authority =

Statutory board under the Ministry of Health of the Singapore Government

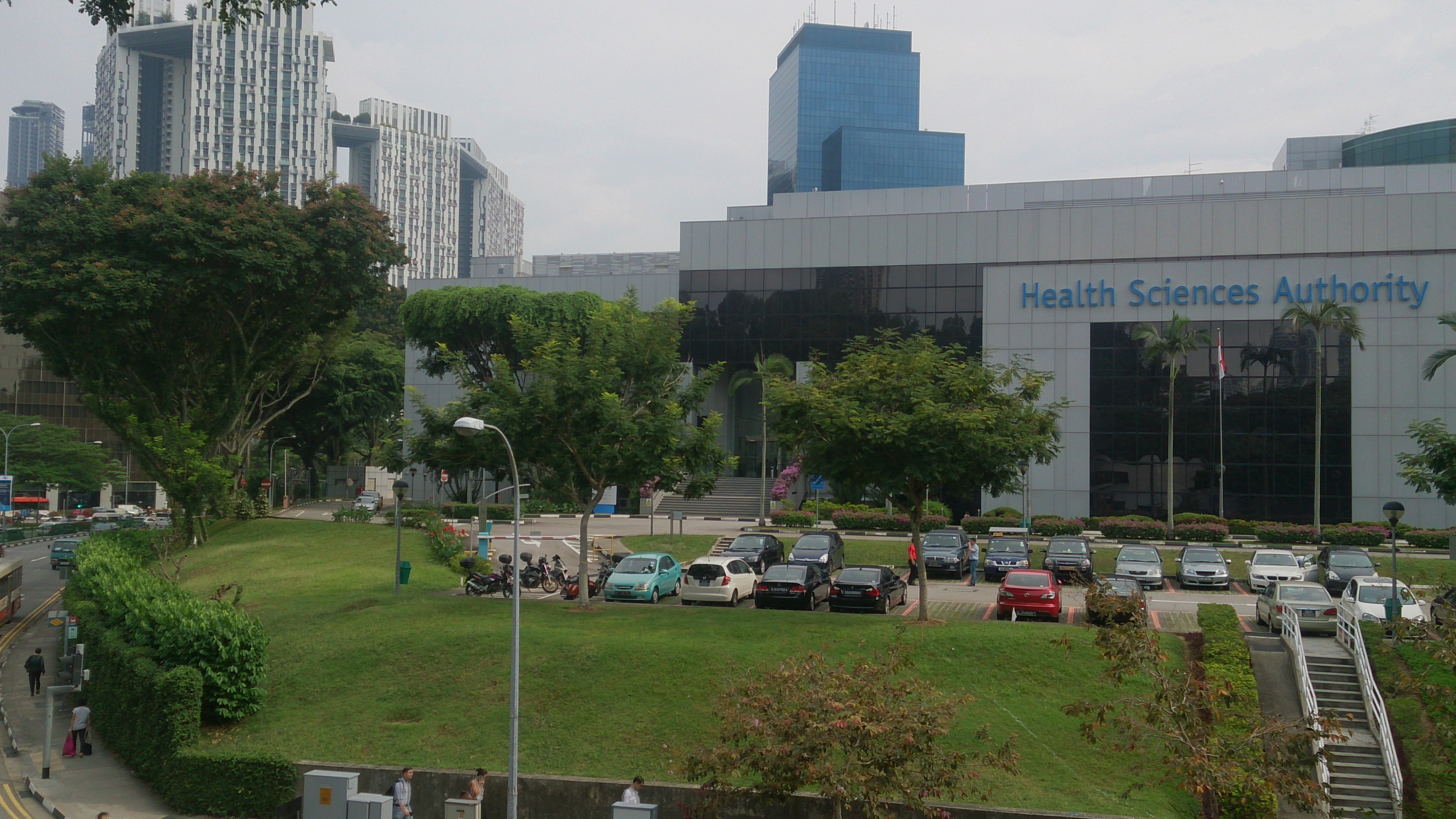

Agency overview
- Formed: 1 April 2001; 25 years ago
- Jurisdiction: Government of Singapore
- Headquarters: 11 Outram Road, Singapore 169078
- Agency executives: Benjamin Ong Kian Chung, Chairman; Adj Prof Raymond Chua, CEO
- Parent agency: Ministry of Health
- Website: www.hsa.gov.sg
- Agency ID: T08GB0015G

The Health Sciences Authority (HSA) is a statutory board under the Ministry of Health of the Government of Singapore. It is a multi-disciplinary agency responsible for applying medical, pharmaceutical, and scientific expertise to protect and advance public health and safety.

The organisation serves three key functions: it is the national regulator for health products; it secures the national blood supply through its operation of the national blood bank and management of transfusion medicine standards; and it represents the national expertise in forensic medicine, forensic science and analytical chemistry testing capabilities. These support other regulatory and compliance agencies in the administration of justice and in safeguarding public health.

== History ==
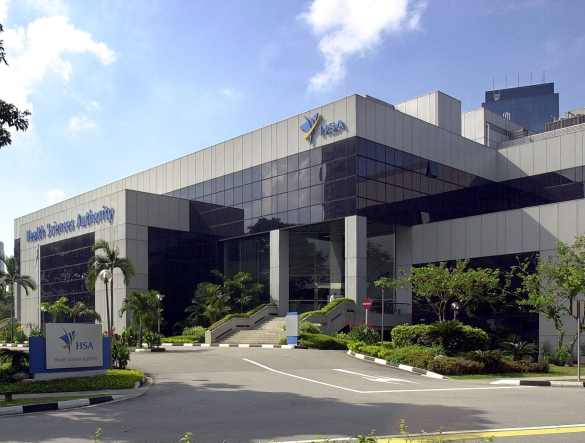
The Health Sciences Authority headquarters at Outram Road, Singapore.

HSA was formed on 1 April 2001 with the integration of five specialised agencies under the Ministry of Health: the Centre for Drug Evaluation; Institute of Science and Forensic Medicine; National Pharmaceutical Administration; Product Regulation Department; and Singapore Blood Transfusion Service.

On 1 April 2019, HSA's food-related duties were absorbed by its successor Singapore Food Agency (SFA) which also absorbed the food-related duties of two other statutory boards namely Agri-Food and Veterinary Authority of Singapore (AVA) and National Environment Agency (NEA). SFA is a statutory board under the Ministry of the Environment and Water Resources.

In February 2022, the HSA became the first regulatory authority in the world to attain the highest maturity level (ML 4) in the World Health Organization's classification of regulatory authorities for medical products. This affirms it as one of the leading regulators at ensuring the quality, safety and efficacy of medical products.

Today, the agency comprises three professional groups: the Health Products Regulation Group; Blood Services Group, and Applied Sciences Group. Each group functions as Divisions comprising branches, units and laboratories. The three professional groups work with the Corporate Services Group which provides strategic direction and corporate support in advancing the organisation.

== Role ==
=== Health products regulation ===
The Health Products Regulation Group ensures that medicines, innovative therapeutics, medical devices and health-related products are wisely regulated and meet appropriate safety, quality and efficacy standards. The agency also contributes to the development of biomedical sciences in Singapore by administering a robust, scientific and responsive regulatory framework.

HSA's risk management system takes into account pre-and-post market precautionary options. On the pre-market front, HSA administers clinical trials for new drugs and grants approvals for these products before they are marketed in Singapore. Audits on good manufacturing and distribution practices are also conducted. Regulation group would evaluate the medical device to determine whether it's acceptable to enter market. The medical device is classified as 4 levels according the product risk from Class A to Class D.

On the post-market front, HSA monitors health products in the market through regular surveillance activities. The agency also carries out investigations and takes enforcement action against illegal activities related to unregistered, counterfeit and adulterated health products. HSA has an established and active pharmacovigilance programme that draws on its network of healthcare professionals and overseas regulators. This allows HSA to initiate targeted and prompt action in response to reported adverse drug reports and expedite the isolation of such problems and minimise harm to public health and safety.

In support of the national objective to reduce smoking, HSA enforces the laws that prohibit tobacco advertisements, smoking by youths under 21 years old as well as the sale of tobacco products to youths in this age group, as well as banning sales of emerging tobacco products such as hookah and electronic cigarettes.

=== National blood service ===
The Blood Services Group is the national blood service of Singapore and is responsible for the adequacy and safety of the country's blood supply. It runs the Bloodbank@HSA in Outram, as well as three satellite blood banks – Bloodbank@Woodlands, Bloodbank@DhobyGhaut and Bloodbank@WestgateTower – which collects, processes, tests and distributes blood and blood components to all hospitals in Singapore. The agency has established a framework to ensure that there is a steady supply of safe blood for day-to-day needs at hospitals and during emergencies. The framework covers the recruitment of voluntary non-remunerated blood donors, stringent blood donation screening criteria, a reliable battery of tests that is conducted on all collected blood, and a comprehensive quality system benchmarked against stringent internationally recognised standards.

The HSA has maintained a strategic partnership with the Singapore Red Cross since 2001 in managing the National Blood Donor Recruitment and Retention Programme.

The agency offers immunohaematology services and tissue typing services to local and regional healthcare institutions, as well as clinical consultative services in the specialty of transfusion medicine. In addition, the agency's cell therapy facility enables one-stop access to cell manufacturing and clinical trial implementation, blood processing and testing services.

=== Forensic and analytical sciences expertise ===
HSA's Applied Sciences Group represents Singapore's national expertise in forensic medicine, forensic sciences, analytical scientific capabilities as well as chemical metrology. This Group supports other regulatory and compliance agencies in the administration of justice and safeguarding public health. The Group comprises: Analytical Science (Chemical Metrology, Food Safety, and Pharmaceutical Divisions), Forensic Medicine and Forensic Science (Biology, Forensic Chemistry & Physics, Illicit Drugs and Analytical Toxicology Divisions).

The range of services cover forensic medical consultancy services in support of death investigation in Singapore; forensic science services such as criminalistics and DNA profiling in support of criminal investigations and illicit drugs control; analytical testing in support of health products regulation, cigarette and tobacco product control; water testing; and food safety testing. Toxicological services are also provided to hospitals.

In collaboration with the Agency for Science, Technology and Research (A*STAR), HSA has been a designated institute for chemical metrology in Singapore since 2008.

== International alliances, affiliations and collaborative efforts ==
HSA has established strong collaborations through Memoranda of Understanding (MOU) with international partners. This is part of its commitment to enhance inter-agency regulatory efforts on the global front. Its international partners include agencies such as the US Food and Drug Administration, Health Canada, Swissmedic, the Australian Therapeutic Goods Administration and China Food and Drug Administration.

HSA's professional groups have been identified as WHO Collaborating Centres in three core areas of expertise - Transfusion Medicine, Drug Quality Assurance and Food Contaminants Monitoring.

HSA has been internationally accredited by the AABB (formerly known as the American Association of Blood Banks), and also the American Society of Histocompatibility & Immunogenetics. It is a founding member of the Asian Pacific Blood Network. As a WHO Collaborating Centre, the agency is an appointed Regional Quality Management Training Centre for Blood Transfusion Services.

It is the first agency outside of the United States of America to be accredited by the National Association of Medical Examiners (NAME), and it also accredited by the American Society of Crime Laboratory Directors/Laboratory Accreditation Board, and the Singapore Laboratory Accreditation Scheme (SINGLAS).

The agency is also a United Nations International Drug Control Programme Reference Laboratory for Biological Specimens and Seized Materials.
