= Meteorological Service Singapore =

Meteorological service of Singapore

- Meteorological Service Singapore logo

Agency overview
- Formed: 1965
- Preceding agencies: Meteorological Branch, Malayan Survey Department; Malayan Meteorological Service
- Jurisdiction: Government of Singapore
- Headquarters: Room 048-033, 4th storey, Changi Airport Terminal 2, Singapore 819643
- Agency executives: Wong Chin Ling, Director-General; Koh Li-Na, Assistant Chief Executive
- Parent agency: National Environment Agency
- Website: www.weather.gov.sg

Meteorological Service Singapore (MSS) is the national meteorological service of Singapore. It is responsible for gathering and recording weather data across the country, issuing weather forecasts, and performing research into Singapore's weather and climate. It is a division of the National Environment Agency, a statutory board under the Ministry of Sustainability and the Environment.

== History ==
Formal record-keeping of weather data in Singapore began in 1869 with the efforts of the Medical Department of the Straits Settlements, whose initial purpose was to investigate a possible link between the spread of diseases and the local weather. A weather station was set up in Outram that year to measure monthly rainfall, marking the beginning of the "climate station" used to compile climatological data for Singapore. The responsibility for collecting weather data was assigned to a new Meteorological Branch under the Malayan Survey Department in 1927. This became the Malayan Meteorological Service (MMS) in 1929, and gained new responsibilities for providing meteorological services (including forecasts and climate research) for the whole of British Malaya. The new MMS was to be headquartered in Fullerton Building. A new "full-scale" weather station was erected at Mount Faber that year and was given the additional task of documenting temperature data, beginning Singapore's official temperature records. In 1934, the climate station and MMS headquarters were moved to Kallang Airport so they could convey more accurate weather information to aircraft.

The MMS functioned as usual during World War II and the Japanese occupation of Singapore in 1942–45. However, the Japanese destroyed the MMS's records and equipment prior to surrendering in 1945; full service was restored only in 1947. Consequently, Singapore's climate records are missing temperature data from 1942–47. With the resumption of full service, the MMS became an independent agency from the Malayan Survey Department. A weather radar with a range of 240 km (150 mi) was set up at Kallang Airport in 1948, and an upper-air observatory was formed in 1953 to study the vertical profile of the atmosphere by releasing weather balloons.

With Singapore's independence from Malaysia in 1965, the observation network in Singapore seceded from the MMS and became Meteorological Service Singapore (MSS), administered by the Deputy Prime Minister's Office. A year later, Singapore (represented by MSS) joined the World Meteorological Organization (WMO). In 1968, administration of MSS was moved to the Ministry of Communications. In 1971, the MSS headquarters and climate station were moved to Paya Lebar Airport, and began receiving satellite imagery the following year. The opening of Changi Airport in 1981 saw the MSS headquarters and climate station relocated there, as well as an upgrade to the weather radar. The move coincided with a "multimillion-dollar computerisation programme" meant to ease the workload on meteorologists.

In 1993, the ASEAN Specialised Meteorological Centre (ASMC) was established with MSS as its host. The purpose of the ASMC was to help develop national meteorological institutions within ASEAN, and today it provides monitoring and warning services for transboundary haze. 1997 saw the installation of a lightning detection system and the weather radar at Changi Airport upgraded to a Doppler weather radar. In 2002, administration of MSS was once again moved to the National Environment Agency under the Ministry of the Environment and Water Resources (now the Ministry of Sustainability and the Environment). The observation network was significantly expanded in 2009 with automated weather stations, and the Doppler weather radar was upgraded the next year to have a range of 480 km (300 mi). The Centre for Climate Research Singapore (CCRS) was established in 2013, with its purpose to research tropical climates using computer models. A "one-stop" website for the public to access weather information was launched in 2015, and a similar mobile phone application in 2016. The WMO opened a regional office in Singapore – hosted by MSS and colocated with the CCRS – in 2017, with the intention of bettering regional coordination on natural disasters. A new supercomputer was acquired from Cray in 2022 to allow MSS to run more complex weather models.

== Organisation ==
MSS comprises four departments:

- Business and Strategy Division
- Centre for Climate Research Singapore
- Meteorological Observations and Systems Division
- Weather Services Division

MSS also hosts the ASEAN Specialised Meteorological Centre and a WMO Regional Office.

MSS's main office is located in Changi Airport's Terminal 2 building, while the CCRS and WMO Regional Office are located in Tai Seng.

== Observations ==
The MSS observation network consists of five staffed weather stations (including the climate station at Changi Airport), nearly 100 automated weather stations, and an upper-air observatory. Atmospheric soundings are taken twice a day from said observatory using radiosondes attached to weather balloons.
