= Pulau Hantu =

Name transcription(s)
  - Chinese: 韩都岛/鬼岛
  - Pinyin: hándū dǎo/guǐ dǎo
  - Malay: Pulau Hantu
  - Tamil: பேய் தீவு
- Location of Pulau Hantu within Singapore
- Coordinates: 1.224°N 103.749°E
- Country: Singapore

Area
  - Total: 12.6 ha (31 acres)

Pulau Hantu is located to the south of the main island of Singapore, off the Straits of Singapore. Pulau Hantu is actually made up of two islets: Pulau Hantu Besar (Big Ghost Island) and Pulau Hantu Kechil (Little Ghost Island), with a total area of 12.6 hectares. At low tide, it is possible to wade across the shallow lagoon between the two islands, but not at high tide.

== Etymology ==
The name of Pulau Hantu literally means "Ghost Island" in Malay.

It may refer to the "disappearing" moment of the middle part of the island during the high tide. During the low tide, Pulau Hantu can be seen as one island with two large bays on its northern and southern sides. However, during the high tide, the water level in both bays would rise and the middle section of the island (which is geographically lower than the other areas) would disappear under the rising tide and thus result in two separate and smaller islands.

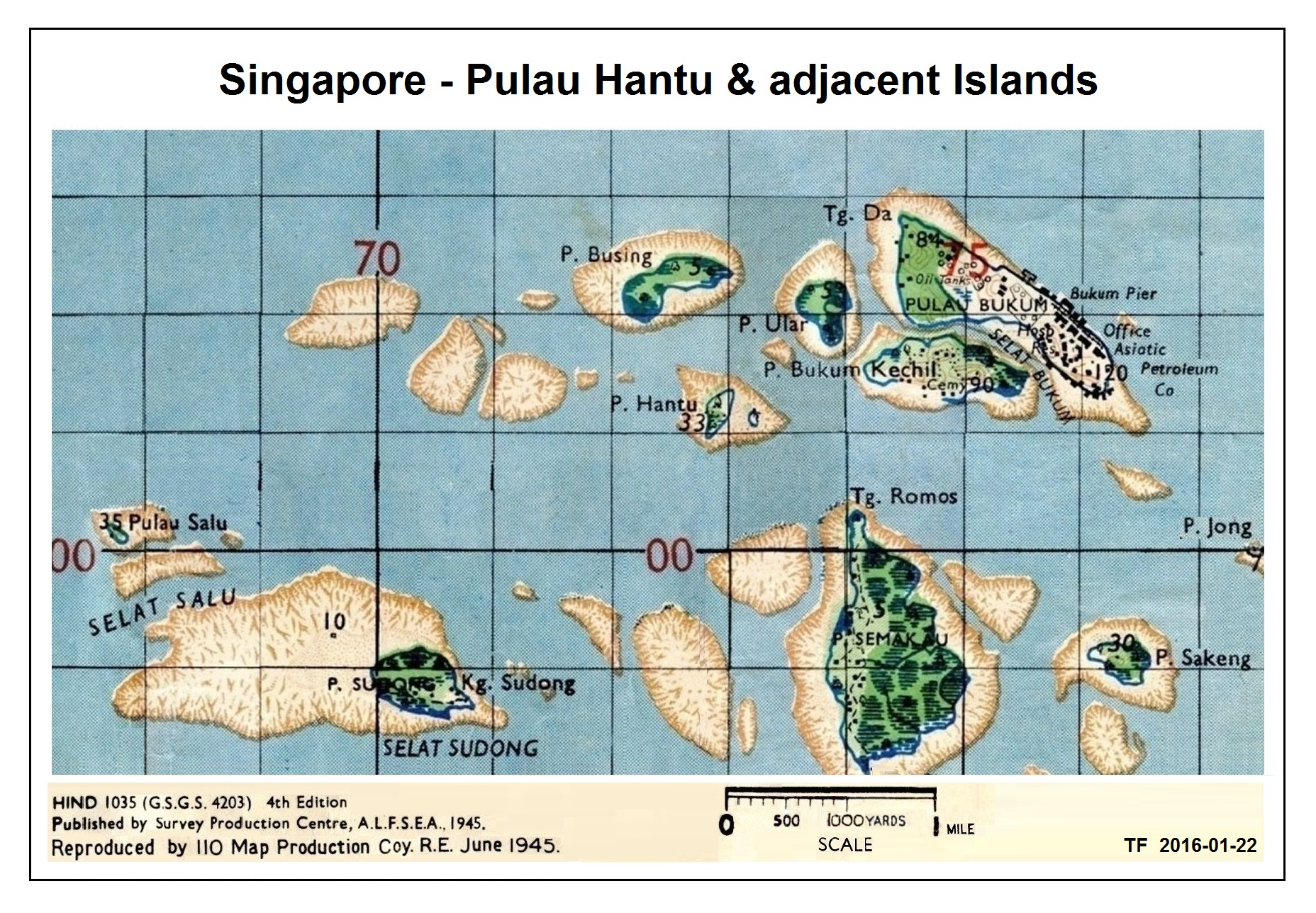
A map dated back to 1945 showing Pulau Hantu, plus larger islands, straits and reefs nearby.

== Legend ==
Pulau Hantu was where ancient Malay warriors once had fierce duels to the death and their ghosts are said to wander on the island.

In particular, there were once two great warriors locked in a ferocious battle at sea. Many people died from their savage fighting and the blue seas surrounding the area slowly turned red and became polluted with human blood, upsetting the Jinns (or spirits, in Islamic culture) at the bottom of the ocean. In anger, one specially-powerful Jinn created a large whirlpool and it sucked the two warriors into the deep sea to drown them. Not deterred, they continued on with their battle. The Jinn then sprayed water on one of the men. The other warrior, seeing his opponent blinded by the water-spray and momentarily dazed, thrust his sword into his abdomen. At the same time, the blinded and wounded warrior managed to plunge his sword into the other man, with both collapsing and dying soon after.

The God, however, felt that it was wrong for the sea-spirits to interfere in human affairs. Thus, the Jinn, being repentant, transformed the two warriors into islets so that their spirits can continue to live on them. As one of the warriors was smaller than the other, his islet was known as Pulau Hantu Kecil (Small Ghost Island), while the bigger one for the larger warrior was called Pulau Hantu Besar (Big Ghost Island).

== Current ==
Despite its name, Pulau Hantu is a popular spot for fishing, scuba diving, and snorkeling enthusiasts because of its sheltered beaches and swimming lagoons. The islands are also popular with campers and day-trippers.

Pulau Hantu has rich reefs despite its proximity to Pulau Bukom's refineries. A wide variety of corals can be found on Pulau Hantu, and mushroom corals are particularly abundant in the waters surrounding the islands. Common sea life that can also be found include the clown fish or anemonefish, damselfishes, wrasses and angelfish. The rare giant clam and the seahorse can sometimes be seen. There is a small patch of mangroves between Pulau Hantu Kecil and Pulau Hantu Besar, where native seashore plants also line their beaches.

Visibility, like most of Singapore's waters, is chronic, ranging from as low as 0.1 m to more than 3m.

It was reported in the 3 June 2006 edition of The Straits Times that a plan to create a "marine sanctuary" has been dropped due to opposition from conservationists. The plan, known as Project Noah, was to install mechanical filters at the two ends of the lagoon separating Pulau Hantu Kecil and Pulau Hantu Besar, to clear the waters of excess silt and pave the way for coral growth within the lagoon.

== Coral reef surveys ==
The National Parks Board, National Biodiversity Centre, Blue Water Volunteers and volunteers from the public started a coral reef surveying programme in 2005 to monitor the status of hard corals, mobile invertebrates and reef fish at several locations around 5 southern islands, including Pulau Hantu. Internationally recognised techniques developed by Reef Check and the Global Coral Reef Monitoring Network were adopted for this programme.
