= Pulau Jong =

Islet in the Singapore Strait

Junk Island
Pulau Jong 炯岛 ஜாங் தீவு
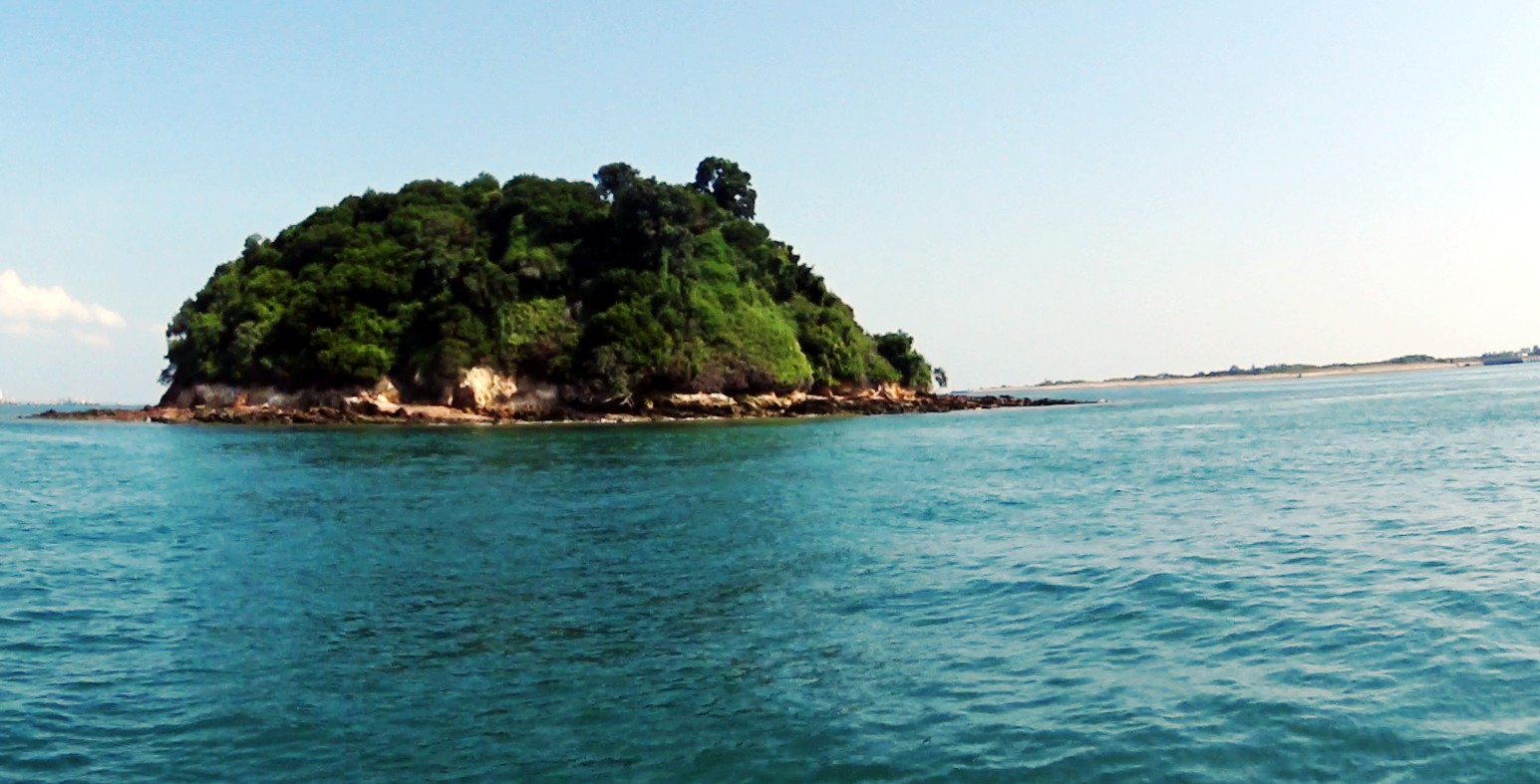
- Pulau Jong in 2014

- Location within Singapore

Geography
- Location: Southeast Asia
- Coordinates: 1°12′54″N 103°47′12″E
- Archipelago: Malay Archipelago
- Area: 0.6 ha (1.5 acres)
- Highest point: 23.4 metres (77 ft)

Administration
- Singapore
- Planning Area: Western Islands

Pulau Jong (Note: (Chinese: 炯岛; pinyin: Qióng dǎo; English: Junk Island)) is a small islet located in the Singapore Strait, just off the southern coast of Singapore Island. It covers an area of 0.6 hectares (1.5 acres).

The island has a recorded history of vascular plant studies dating back to Richard Eric Holttum in 1925, with later references by James Sinclair in 1950 and Anne Johnson in 1977. The island was selected for a botanical survey due to its largely undisturbed state, attributed to its steep terrain, small size, lack of freshwater, and a long-standing reputation for being haunted, factors that have discouraged human settlement.

== Etymology ==
The name "Jong," meaning "junk" in Malay, likely refers to the island's dome-like shape, which resembles the traditional sailing vessels known as junks.

== Geography ==
Pulau Jong is a small, dome-shaped island of approximately 0.6 hectares off the southern coast of the Singapore mainland. The island is surrounded by Pulau Bukom to the northwest, Pulau Sakeng to the southwest, and Pulau Sebarok to the southeast. The island remains untouched by man, with virtually no settlement proofs. Ancient accounts report a few headstones on the shore and a peeling flagpole at the summit, a 23.4-metre (77 ft) high point.

Geologically, Pulau Jong is important as the type locality of the Jong Facies. It is made up of beds of alternating roundedstone conglomerate and sandstone with occasional beds of mudstone. While there is no direct climatic record in the island, its climate would be comparable to mainland Singapore's, which is an equatorial climate with high temperature, humidity, and rain throughout the year.

== Flora and fauna ==
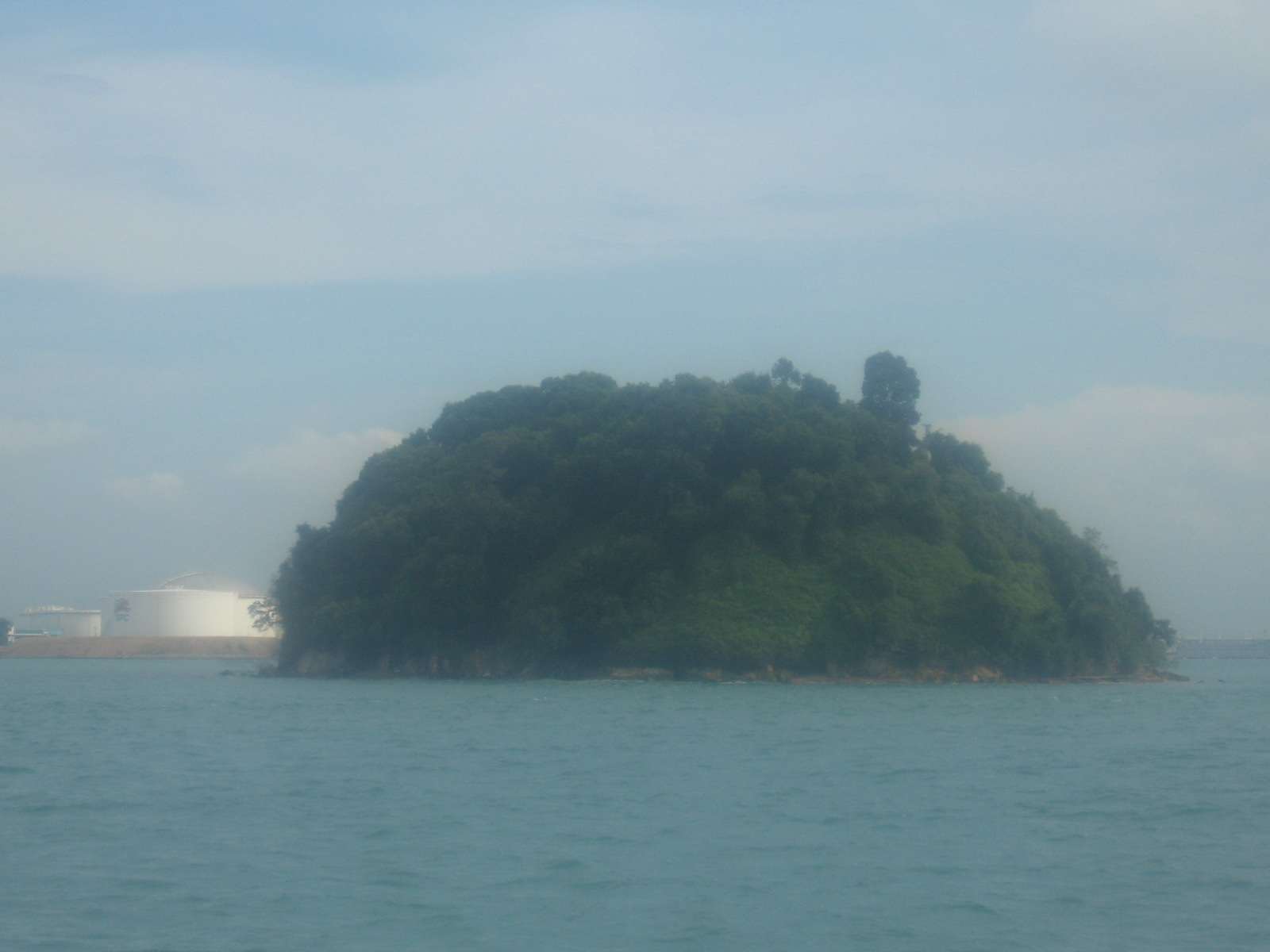
Pulau Jong in 2006

A 1994 botanical survey tallied 38 vascular plant species, comprising ferns, gymnosperms, and angiosperms, for a total of 52 species when including historical records. The island's flora constitutes about 1.5% of Singapore's total flora but just 0.0009% of its land area.

The flora is dominated by species found in beach, secondary forest, and certain mangrove communities. Some rare, vulnerable, or endangered species were encountered on the island, such as Podocarpus polystachyus, Pongamia pinnata, Pteris carinata, Schefflera elliptica, Gnetum microcarpum, Tarenna fragrans, Ficus globosa, Memecylon edule, and Xylocarpus granatum. Some species previously recorded by earlier botanists, such as Holttum, are now locally extinct, while others, such as Eugenia spicata and Eugenia grandis, are more abundant now.

The island is also home to secondary scrub vegetation, a type of secondary growth that typically emerges on eroded or nutrient-poor soil. This vegetation includes species such as Adinandra dumosa (tiup-tiup), Dillenia suffruticosa (simpoh ayer), and various species of Nepenthes (pitcher plants). These plant communities are characteristic of disturbed environments and represent an early stage of natural regeneration, commonly found on certain islands like Pulau Jong.

Slope vegetation is more or less the same as in earlier reports, but the summit area has undergone considerable development. From being open with fern and grass predominance, it is now thickly blanketed with secondary forest of up to eight-metre-high trees, contrary to the initial expectation that poor conditions would not support the growth of tall vegetation. The island's relative freedom from disturbance and presence of rare species make it a worthwhile site for conservation.
