= Singapore Food Agency =

Statutory board in Singapore

Agency overview
- Formed: 1 April 2019; 7 years ago
- Preceding agency: Agri-Food and Veterinary Authority of Singapore (AVA)
- Jurisdiction: Government of Singapore
- Headquarters: 52 Jurong Gateway Road, #14-01, Singapore 608550
- Agency executives: Lim Chuan Poh, Chairman; Damian Chan Chee Weng, CEO
- Parent agency: Ministry of Sustainability and the Environment
- Website: sfa.gov.sg
- Agency ID: T18GB0002F

The Singapore Food Agency (SFA) is a statutory board under the Ministry of Sustainability and the Environment that oversees food safety and security in Singapore. Launched on 1 April 2019, the agency is a consolidation of all food-related functions of Agri-Food and Veterinary Authority of Singapore (AVA), National Environment Agency (NEA) and the Health Sciences Authority.

== History ==
The agency was first announced on 26 July 2018 as a consolidation of all food-related functions of the Singapore government, which had previously been carried out by the AVA, NEA)and the HSA. As part of this move, the National Centre for Food Science (NCFS) was established to consolidate the food laboratory capabilities that were formerly distributed across the different statutory boards. Concurrently, the Agri-Food and Veterinary Authority of Singapore was to be abolished, with its non-food plant and animal-related functions to be transferred to the National Parks Board (NParks).

The agency was launched on 1 April 2019 by Minister for the Environment and Water Resources Masagos Zulkifli. Part of its mission will be to increase Singapore's home-grown food production capacity; the government has set a target to produce 30% of its food needs locally by 2030, up from 10% in 2019. In 2025, these goals were replaced with new targets for Singapore's local farms to supply 20 per cent of the country's commonly consumed fibre sources (comprising leafy and fruited vegetables, bean sprouts and mushrooms) and 30 per cent of the domestic consumption of eggs and seafood by 2035.

Singapore was ranked 1st on the Global Food Security Index in 2019.
