= Urban-wildlife interactions in Singapore =

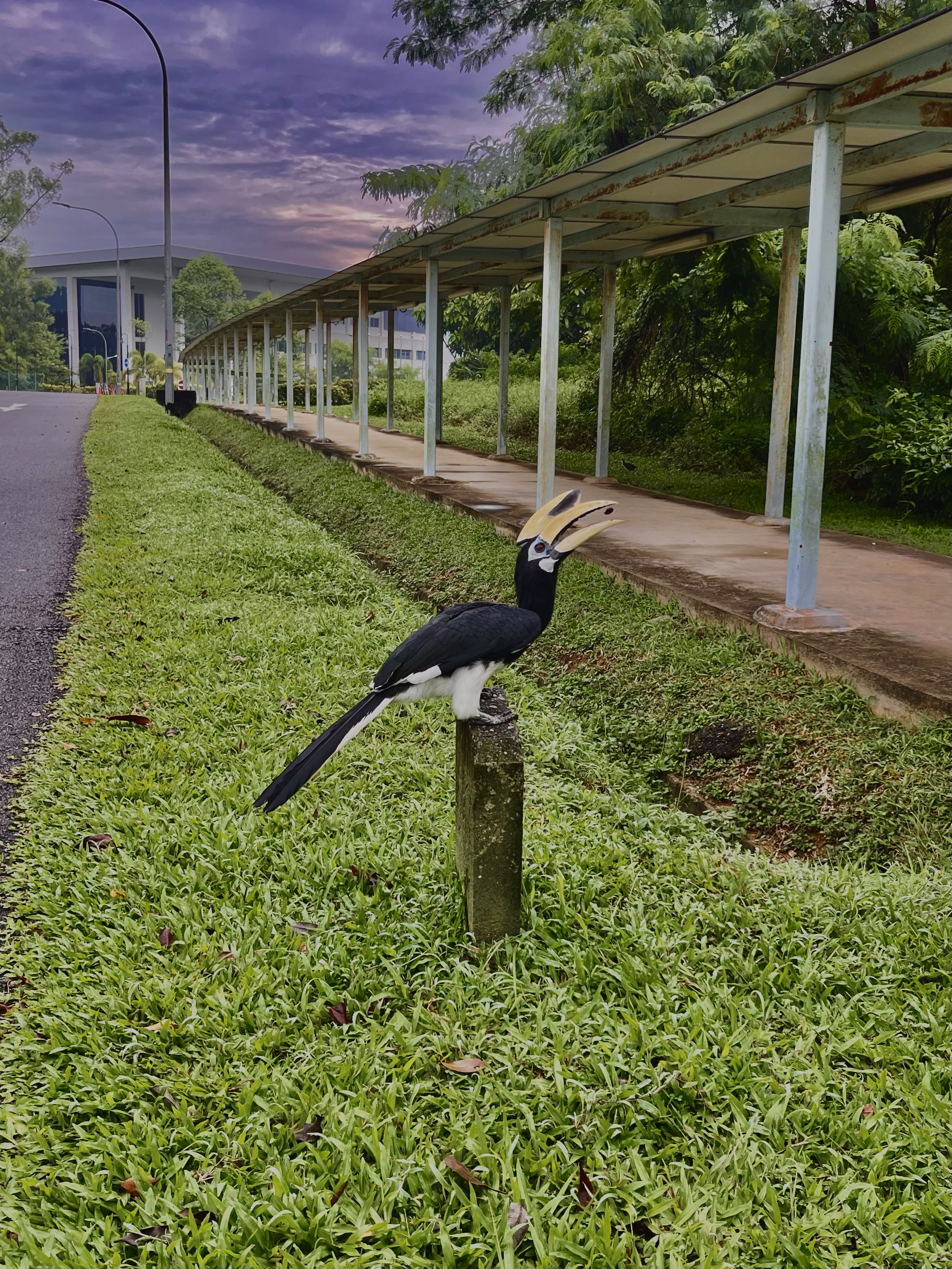
An oriental pied hornbill at a roadside in Singapore

Interactions between people and wildlife have been an evolving aspect of Singapore's history. As a rapidly urbanising nation, the city-state has experienced a significant transformation of its natural habitats, leading to complex interactions between humans and wildlife. The island's unique geographical location and tropical climate have all played a role in shaping these interactions.

The history of urban wildlife interactions in Singapore can be traced back to the mid-19th century. In John Crawfurd's Descriptive Dictionary of the Indian Islands and Adjacent Countries (1856), he describes the wide variety of species of fauna he spotted during his time in Singapore. As the second Resident of Singapore, he noted many descriptions on the types of animals he observed. Most notably, he noted the presence of tigers prevalent throughout the island.

== Types of animals ==
=== Tigers ===
Tigers (Panthera tigris) were one of the most common animals that came into conflict with both the inhabitants of early Singapore as well as the British colonial authorities. These large cats were especially prevalent in the Malay Peninsula as well as Sumatra. The British sought to expand their influence from the main Port of Singapore into the densely populated forests of the island to establish gambier and pepper plantations, these efforts began to encroach on the natural habitats of native tigers on the island. The first incident of a tiger attack within the colony was in September 1831, on a Chinese woodcutter whose body was found near a gambier plantation. Subsequent attacks were reported in local newspapers from 1840 until 1940, increasing the general public's awareness of the possible dangers.

William Butterworth, Governor of the Straits Settlements from August 1843 until March 1855, was questioned by the British House of Commons on the tiger attacks happening in the Straits Settlements and specifically, Singapore, to which he estimated the figures of tiger attacks at around 200 deaths per year. Monetary bounties were established for the capture or killing of tigers, going up from $20 to $150, which contributed to a steep decline in the population of tigers on the island. The last recorded instance of a tiger encounter occurred in October 1930, where a tiger was shot in the village of Choa Chu Kang.

=== Insects ===
Before Singapore's rapid urbanisation, the island was covered in dense tropical rainforests. This natural environment provided a haven for a diverse range of insects, playing essential roles in the ecosystem, such as to nutrient cycling, pollination, and serving as food sources for other animals.

The British colonial period witnessed a dramatic transformation of Singapore's landscape. Deforestation, land reclamation, and the construction of infrastructure created new habitats for insects, while also increasing human-insect contact.

For instance, ants have long been a part of Singapore's urban landscape. Their ability to thrive in diverse habitats, from dense forests to urban areas, has ensured their continued presence. In the past, ants were primarily seen as agricultural pests, damaging crops and invading homes. However, as Singapore modernised, their role shifted. Urban development created new niches for ants, such as cracks in buildings and sewers. Termites, also known colloquially as white ants, were vilified by British authorities for the damage they caused to wooden property. This negative portrayal contributed to the perception of these insects as a threat to colonial rule, necessitating a comprehensive approach to dampen the effects of these insects.

British colonial authorities responded to these health threats by implementing public health measures, such as draining swamps, spraying insecticides, and promoting personal hygiene.

After Singapore gained independence in 1965, the government prioritised urban development and modernisation. This included a strong emphasis on cleanliness and hygiene. Public health campaigns were launched to educate the population about the importance of proper sanitation, waste management, and pest control.

The National Environment Agency (NEA), established in 1971, has played a crucial role in managing Singapore's urban environment and combating insect pests. The NEA implemented various strategies, such as integrated pest management (IPM), to control insect populations while minimising the use of harmful chemicals. However, the challenge of managing insect populations still remains as the nation-state continues to grow.

== History of notable incidents ==
=== 1819-1965: Colonial Singapore ===
==== (1902) Tiger spotted in the Raffles Hotel ====
In August 1902, a tiger escaped from a circus performing nearby at the end of Beach Road. The Raffles Hotel, was a luxurious hotel on the same street, with parts of the building under renovation that day. The tiger wandered near the Singapore Volunteer Corps Drill Hall, before allegedly scratching a watchman on a towboat. It was then sighted swimming into the Singapore River, and made its way towards Raffles Hotel.

As the Bar & Billiard Room in the Raffles Hotel was closing for the night, the bartender's helper spotted the tiger resting in the basement of the room. Hotel management was informed by the next day in the early morning and requested for Charles McGowan Phillips, the headmaster of Raffles Institution and an experienced shooter, to dispatch the tiger under the Bar & Billiard Room. Phillips showed up to the Raffles Hotel with his Lee-Enfield rifle.

Immediately after he spotted the tiger in the basement, he fired three shots from his rifle which all missed, presumably due to the lack of light in the room. Phillips took aim again, then fired another shot, which struck the tiger, before putting it down with a final round from his rifle.

The tale of the tiger in the Raffles Hotel was often retold and dramaticised over the decades, with the Raffles Hotel often publicising the incident through merchandise or events.

=== 1965-present: Post-independence Singapore ===
==== (1973) Black panther escape from Singapore Zoo ====
Other than tigers, leopards are also another species of big cats that have been sighted in Singapore since the 19th century until the mid-20th century, with the earliest known recorded incident being dated back to July 1864. Leopards found within the Malay Peninsula are typically black in colouration (a sign of melanism). Known colloquially as black panthers, their black fur likely made them more difficult to spot in the dense forests of the region.

One of the most well-recorded instances of black panthers encountering the urban environment in Singapore happened in March 1973. A two-year old black panther, named Black Twiggy, escaped from her quarantine cage in the then still-under-construction Singapore Zoo.

Proceeding this, an intense eleven-month search began throughout the surrounding area for the animal. Roaming parties of game hunters, traps and live bait were all used to try to recapture Black Twiggy over this time period. However, the search came to an end in January 1974, where after cornering the animal in a storm drain, Black Twiggy succumbed to injuries ensued when authorities and trackers were trying to flush it out of its hiding spot.

==== (1974) Hippopotamus escape at Upper Seletar Reservoir ====
In January 1974, Congo, a hippopotamus from the Singapore Zoo, escaped from his enclosure into Upper Seletar Reservoir. Congo spent up to 47 days in the reservoir, with trackers from the Singapore Zoo finally being able to lure it into a cage, which was subsequently transferred back to the zoo.

==== (1990-1991) Elephant sightings on Pulau Tekong & Pulau Ubin ====
In May 1990, three male Asian elephants were spotted by Singaporean national servicemen during training on Pulau Tekong, an offshore island used by the Singapore Armed Forces. The trio of elephants were tracked throughout the island via the evidence of their passage, such as damages to the environment, public property, as well as the presence of elephant excrement.

The breaking story gained much traction in newspapers on the mainland, as it was the first instance in recorded history where elephants had been sighted in Singapore or its offshore islands. There were some public sentiments from Singaporeans who believed that the elephants should be allowed to reside on Pulau Tekong. However, the then-director of the Singapore Zoological Gardens, Bernard Harrison, strongly discouraged this as gunshots from the presence of live-firing on the island could agitate the elephants and lead to a possible hostile attack.

The operation to remove the trio of elephants from Pulau Tekong started on 6 June 1990. Together with the help of the Department of Wildlife and National Parks Peninsular Malaysia and two trained female elephants, trackers from the Singapore Zoo managed to capture all three elephants within four days. The elephants were subsequently moved to the Endau-Rompin National Park in Johor.

A year later, in March 1991, another male Asian elephant was spotted on the island of Pulau Ubin. Though first assumed to have been from the same herd as the elephants on Pulau Tekong in the previous year, this was debunked by the Singapore Zoological Gardens who stated that this particular elephant did not bear the same markings which were found on the trio of elephants on Pulau Tekong.

An incident involving a 64-year-old villager who was attacked by the elephant while praying at a shrine, complimented by to further sightings of the elephant, led to concerns for the safety of residents and visitors to the island.

The same authorities which were involved in the previous year's operation on Pulau Tekong were once again engaged to capture the elephant. After several days of tracking and monitoring, the elephant was successfully captured on 6 March 1991, before being tranquilized three days later, and subsequently relocated to Endau-Rompin National Park.

== Conservation efforts ==
=== (1875-1903) Singapore Botanic Gardens ===
First conceptualised by Sir Harry St. George Ord, the Governor of the Straits Settlements in 1867, the idea of a zoological garden had previously been brought up by both Sir Stamford Raffles and William Farquhar. Ord had proposed this to the Agri-Horticultural Society in Singapore, offering to include several animals including two elephants and a black panther, as well as the colonial government's hand in covering the costs of maintaining the upkeep costs of the proposed zoo.

It was not until January 1875, where the Agri-Horticultural Society handed the rights to manage the Singapore Botanical Gardens over to a committee appointed by the colonial government. With Henry James Murton, an experienced horticulturalist from the Royal Botanic Gardens, appointed as the superintendent of the Singapore Botanical Gardens, Ord's plans for the proposed zoo went underway.

By 1876, the collection of animals in the Singapore Botanical Gardens had amassed to an impressive amount. From the records of William Krohn, the superintendent of the zoological gardens, the zoo had now boasted more than fifty species of animals on its premises. This allowed for the public to safely observe animals in an educational setting and learn more about animal behaviour.

Eventually, the costs of maintaining the enclosures exceeded the original budget planned for the zoological gardens. Many of the larger animals had to be sent abroad, and the zoo within the Singapore Botanical Gardens was scaled down to just include smaller animals and birds. However, despite calls from the public to increase funding for the first public zoo within the Singapore Botanical Gardens, it closed its doors in 1903 due to high maintenance costs, with most of the animals being sold off by the colonial government.

=== (1928-1943) Punggol Road Zoo ===
Established by William Laurence Soma Basapa, a renowned landowner, philanthropist and animal enthusiast, the Punggol Zoo was established in 1928. Basapa's passion for collecting exotic animals extended to a wide variety of species, from orangutans to honeybears. Originally located within the premises of his home at 549 Upper Serangoon Road, Basapa decided to shift the animals to a 27-acre plot of land near the sea, close to Punggol. The 27-acre plot of land included a generator, workers' quarters as well as a seafacing bungalow for his family.

Basapa's efforts towards conservation of wildlife came in the form of donations to the Raffles Museum of Biodiversity Research. Reports of the Raffles Museum from 1928 till 1938 showed periodic donations of animal carcasses to the museum from Basapa's menagerie. When the museum was renamed to the Lee Kong Chian National History Museum, more than 80 of the zoological specimens donated by Basapa were inherited, and still remain till today.

=== (1973-present) Singapore Zoological Gardens ===
The Singapore Zoological Gardens was conceptualised by the chairman of the Public Utilities Board (PUB), Dr. Ong Swee Lau, in 1968. Also known as the Singapore Zoo, the park opened its doors on 29 June 1973. Initially, the Singapore Zoo opened with 272 animals housed in 50 enclosures, from over 72 countries.

The area of the zoo was designed such that it fit in well with the surrounding area, which was heavily forested. There was significant effort, manpower and capital dedicated towards this goal. Extensive landscaping such as replacement of unwanted shrubs and trees with those that provide much needed shade from the tropical climate. To that end, the enclosures of animals were largely kept in an "open concept" design, without the need for cages, to as close as possible mimic the natural habitats of these creatures. Along with a concerted effort to keep admission prices low for Singaporeans, this lowered barrier of entry allowed for more residents to be able to visit and appreciate the animals housed within the premises of the zoo.

Over the last 40 years, the Singapore Zoo has taken significant strides towards the conservation of wildlife. The first polar bear cub born in the tropics, Inuka, was unexpectedly born within the zoo in December 1990. It was perceived as a testament to the success of the Singapore Zoological Gardens's conservation efforts, as a renowned global zoological institution.

In March 2006, the Singapore Zoo opened its S$3.6-million Wildlife Healthcare and Research Centre. The 1,600 sqm building includes a fully-equipped operating theatre, as well as extensive treatment facilities able to give advanced care to the animals housed in the Singapore Zoo, Night Safari, River Wonders and Bird Paradise.

The Singapore Zoo has also introduced various initiatives to engage the public in its development and upkeep. These initiatives include the Friends of the Zoo programme, the Animal Adoption Scheme, and various educational and volunteer programmes. These programmes aim to educate and engage visitors on wildlife conservation through the zoo's efforts.

== See also ==
- Stray cats in Singapore
