= Ministry of Sustainability and the Environment =

Government ministry of Singapore

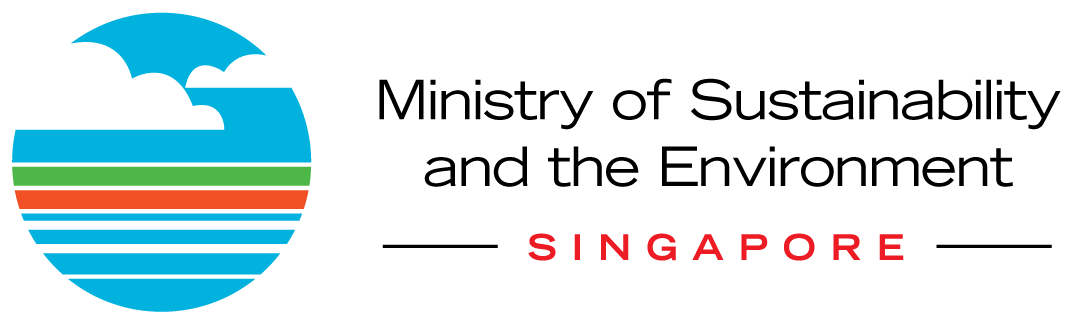

Agency overview
- Formed: 1972; 54 years ago
- Jurisdiction: Government of Singapore
- Headquarters: 40 Scotts Road #24-00, Environment Building, Singapore 228231
- Motto: Sustainable Singapore
- Employees: 4,493 (2018)
- Annual budget: ▲ S$2.75 billion (2019)
- Ministers responsible: Grace Fu, Minister; Janil Puthucheary, Senior Minister of State; Goh Hanyan, Senior Parliamentary Secretary
- Agency executives: Melvyn Ong, Permanent Secretary; Benjamin Koh, Deputy Secretary (Sustainability); Lim Teck Kiat, Deputy Secretary (Resilience); Lim Tuang Liang, Government Chief Sustainability Officer / Deputy Secretary (Special Duties)
- Child agencies: National Environment Agency; Public Utilities Board; Singapore Food Agency
- Website: www.mse.gov.sg
- Agency ID: T08GA0021G

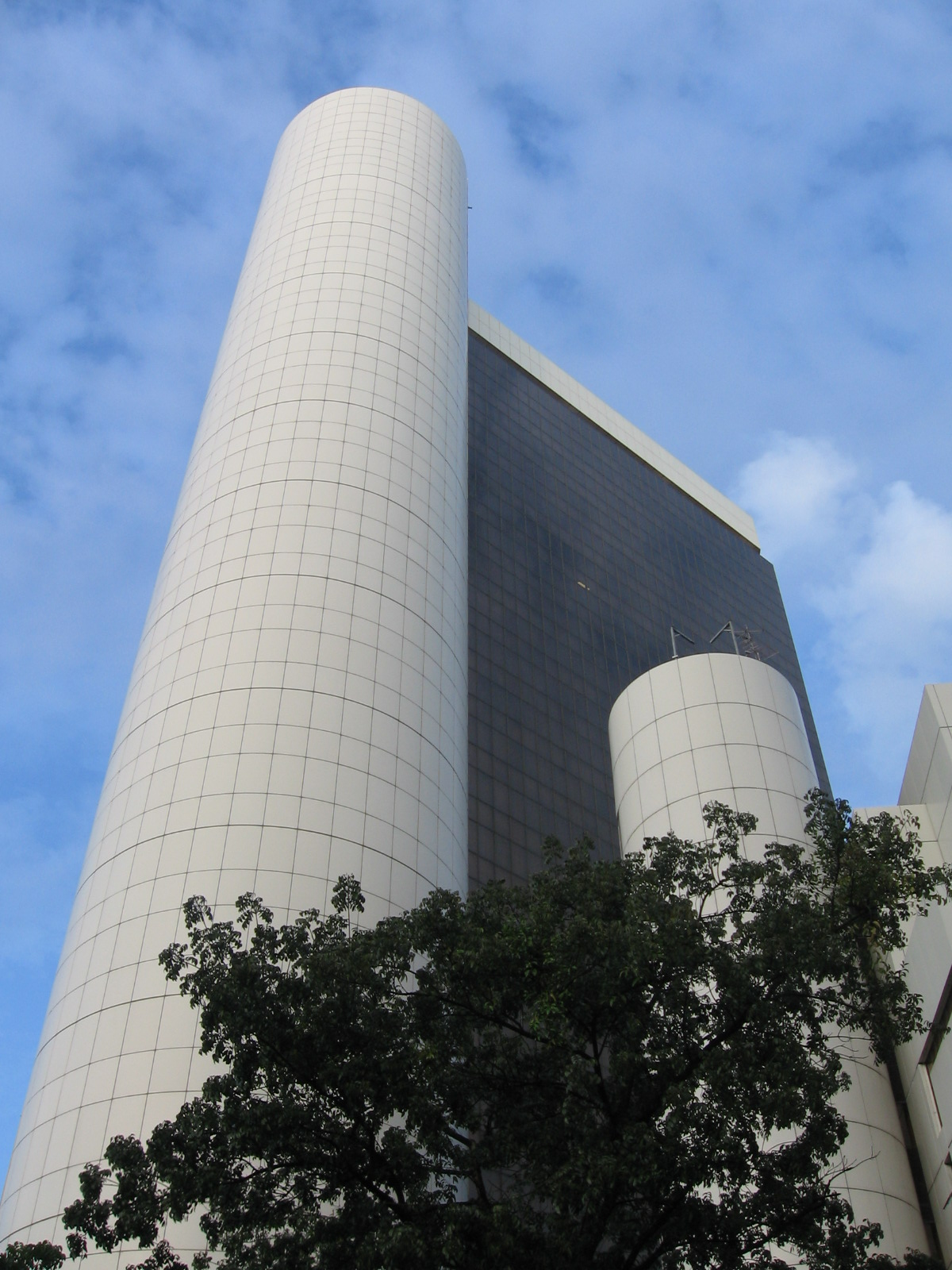
Environment Building on Scotts Road, headquarters of the Ministry of Sustainability and the Environment.

The Ministry of Sustainability and the Environment (MSE; Malay: Kementerian Kemampanan dan Sekitaran; Chinese: 永续发展与环境部; Tamil: நீடித்த நிலைத்தன்மை, சுற்றுப்புற அமைச்சு) is a ministry of the Government of Singapore responsible for the formulation and implementation of policies related to the environment, water and food of Singapore.

== History ==
The Ministry of Sustainability and the Environment (MSE) was established in 1972 as the Ministry of the Environment (ENV). It was later renamed the Ministry of Environment and Water Resources (MEWR) in 2004. On 25 July 2020, the Ministry was renamed to Ministry of Sustainability and the Environment.

== Responsibilities ==
The Ministry is responsible for providing a quality living environment and a high standard of public health, protected against the spread of communicable diseases. It also has to ensure a clean and hygienic living environment, as well as managing the complete water cycle – from sourcing, collection, purification, and supply of drinking water; to the treatment of used water and recycling into NEWater; desalination; as well as storm water drainage. Since 1 April 2019, it also handles food issues through the Singapore Food Agency (SFA).

== Organisational structure ==
The Ministry oversees three statutory boards – the National Environment Agency, Public Utilities Board, and the Singapore Food Agency.

=== Statutory Boards ===
- National Environment Agency
- Public Utilities Board
- Singapore Food Agency

== Ministers ==
The Ministry is headed by the Minister for Sustainability and the Environment, who is appointed as part of the Cabinet of Singapore. The incubment Minister is Grace Fu, an MP for Jurong East–Bukit Batok GRC from the People's Action Party.

=== Minister for the Environment (1972–2004) ===
Minister	Took office	Left office	Party	Cabinet
Lim Kim San; MP for Cairnhill (1916–2006)	16 September 1972	1 June 1975	PAP	Lee K. IV
E. W. Barker; MP for Tanglin (1920–2001)	2 June 1975	31 January 1979	PAP	Lee K. IV
E. W. Barker; MP for Tanglin (1920–2001)	2 June 1975	31 January 1979	PAP	Lee K. V
Lim Kim San; MP for Cairnhill (1916–2006)	1 February 1979	6 January 1981	PAP	Lee K. V
Ong Pang Boon; MP for Telok Ayer (born 1929)	6 January 1981	1 January 1985	PAP	Lee K. VI
Ahmad Mattar; MP for Brickworks (until 1988) and Brickworks GRC (from 1988) (born 1940)	2 January 1985	30 June 1993	PAP	Lee K. VII
Ahmad Mattar; MP for Brickworks (until 1988) and Brickworks GRC (from 1988) (born 1940)	2 January 1985	30 June 1993	PAP	Lee K. VIII
Ahmad Mattar; MP for Brickworks (until 1988) and Brickworks GRC (from 1988) (born 1940)	2 January 1985	30 June 1993	PAP	Goh I
Ahmad Mattar; MP for Brickworks (until 1988) and Brickworks GRC (from 1988) (born 1940)	2 January 1985	30 June 1993	PAP	Goh II
Mah Bow Tan; MP for Tampines GRC (born 1948)	1 July 1993	16 April 1995	PAP	Goh II
Teo Chee Hean (Note: Teo Chee Hean served as acting minister from 17 April 1995 until 14 January 1996.); MP for Marine Parade GRC (born 1954)	17 April 1995	14 January 1996	PAP	Goh II
Teo Chee Hean; MP for Marine Parade GRC (born 1954)	15 January 1996	24 January 1997	PAP	Goh II
Yeo Cheow Tong; MP for Hong Kah GRC (born 1947)	25 January 1997	2 June 1999	PAP	Goh III
Lee Yock Suan; MP for Cheng San GRC (born 1946)	3 June 1999	30 September 2000	PAP	Goh III
Lim Swee Say (Note: Lim Swee Say served as acting minister from 1 October 2000 until 22 November 2001.); MP for Tanjong Pagar GRC (until 2001) and Holland–Bukit Panjang GRC (from 2001) (born 1954)	1 October 2000	22 November 2001	PAP	Goh III
Lim Swee Say; MP for Tanjong Pagar GRC (until 2001) and Holland–Bukit Panjang GRC (from 2001) (born 1954)	23 November 2001	11 August 2004	PAP	Goh IV

=== Minister for the Environment and Water Resources (2004–2020) ===
Minister	Took office	Left office	Party	Cabinet
Yaacob Ibrahim; MP for Jalan Besar GRC (born 1955)	12 August 2004	20 May 2011	PAP	Lee H. I
Yaacob Ibrahim; MP for Jalan Besar GRC (born 1955)	12 August 2004	20 May 2011	PAP	Lee H. II
Vivian Balakrishnan; MP for Holland–Bukit Timah GRC (born 1961)	21 May 2011	30 September 2015	PAP	Lee H. III
Masagos Zulkifli; MP for Tampines GRC (born 1963)	1 October 2015	26 July 2020	PAP	Lee H. IV

=== Minister for Sustainability and the Environment (2020–present) ===
Minister	Took office	Left office	Party	Cabinet
Grace Fu; MP for Yuhua SMC (until 2025) and Jurong East–Bukit Batok GRC (from 2025) (born 1964)	27 July 2020	Incumbent	PAP	Lee H. V
Grace Fu; MP for Yuhua SMC (until 2025) and Jurong East–Bukit Batok GRC (from 2025) (born 1964)	27 July 2020	Incumbent	PAP	Wong I
Grace Fu; MP for Yuhua SMC (until 2025) and Jurong East–Bukit Batok GRC (from 2025) (born 1964)	27 July 2020	Incumbent	PAP	Wong II

== See also ==
- Organisations of the Singapore Government
- President's Award for the Environment
- Statutory boards of the Singapore Government
