= Outline of Singapore =

Country in the Malay Peninsula in Southeast Asia

The Flag of Singapore

The location of Singapore

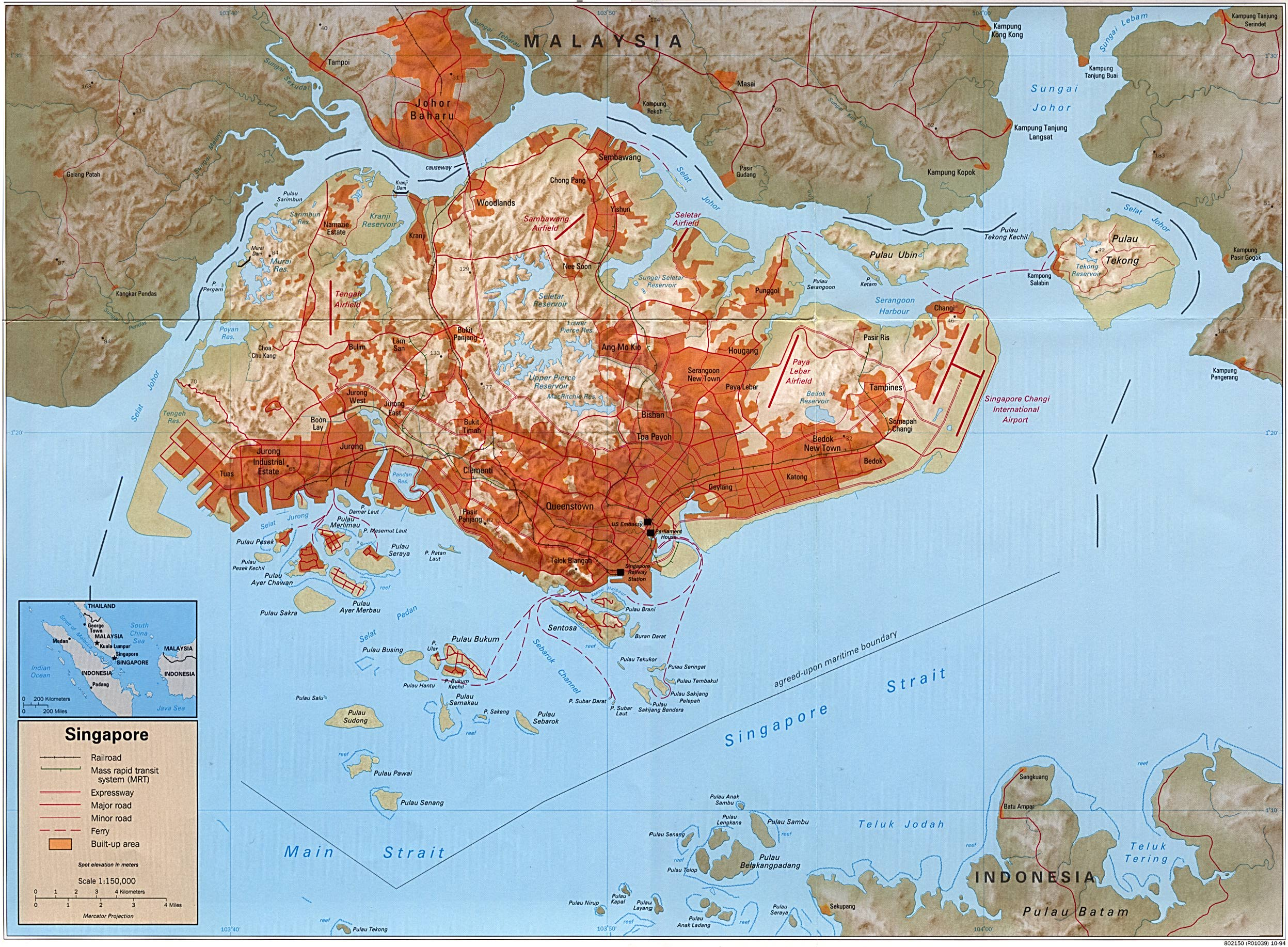
An enlargeable relief map of the Republic of Singapore, published in 1994

The following outline is provided as an overview and topical guide to Singapore:

Singapore – a sovereign republic comprising the main island of Singapore and smaller outlying islands which are located at the southern tip of the Malay Peninsula in Southeast Asia. Singapore lies 137 kilometres (85 mi) north of the equator, south of the Malaysian state of Johor and north of Indonesia's Riau Islands and is in-between the Straits of Malacca and the South China Sea.

Singapore is one of the three city-states in the world, along with Monaco and the Vatican City, and is the only one with full self-governance, its own currency, and a significant military force; The Economist refers to Singapore as the "world's only fully functioning city-state". It is the second smallest nation in Asia by land area, ahead of Maldives and similar to Bahrain.

== General reference ==
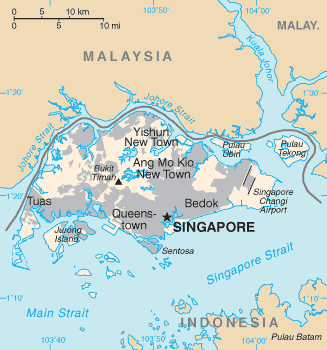
An enlargeable basic map of Singapore, published in 2003

- Pronunciation: /ˈsɪŋəpɔːr/ or /ˈsɪŋɡəpɔːr/
- Common English country name: Singapore
- Official English country name: The Republic of Singapore
- Official endonyms: Singapore (English), Singapura (Malay), 新加坡 (Pinyin: Xīnjiāpō, Mandarin), சிங்கப்பூர் (Ciŋkappūr, Tamil)
- Common endonyms: Lion City, Little red dot, Temasek
- Adjectival(s): Singaporean
- Demonym(s): Singaporean
- Etymology: Name of Singapore
- International rankings of Singapore
- ISO country codes: SG, SGP, 702
- ISO region codes: See ISO 3166-2:SG
- Internet country code top-level domain: .sg
  - Internationalised country code top-level domains: .新加坡 (encoded as .xn—yfro4i67o) and .சிங்கப்பூர் (encoded as .xn—clchc0ea0b2g2a9gcd)

== Geography of Singapore ==
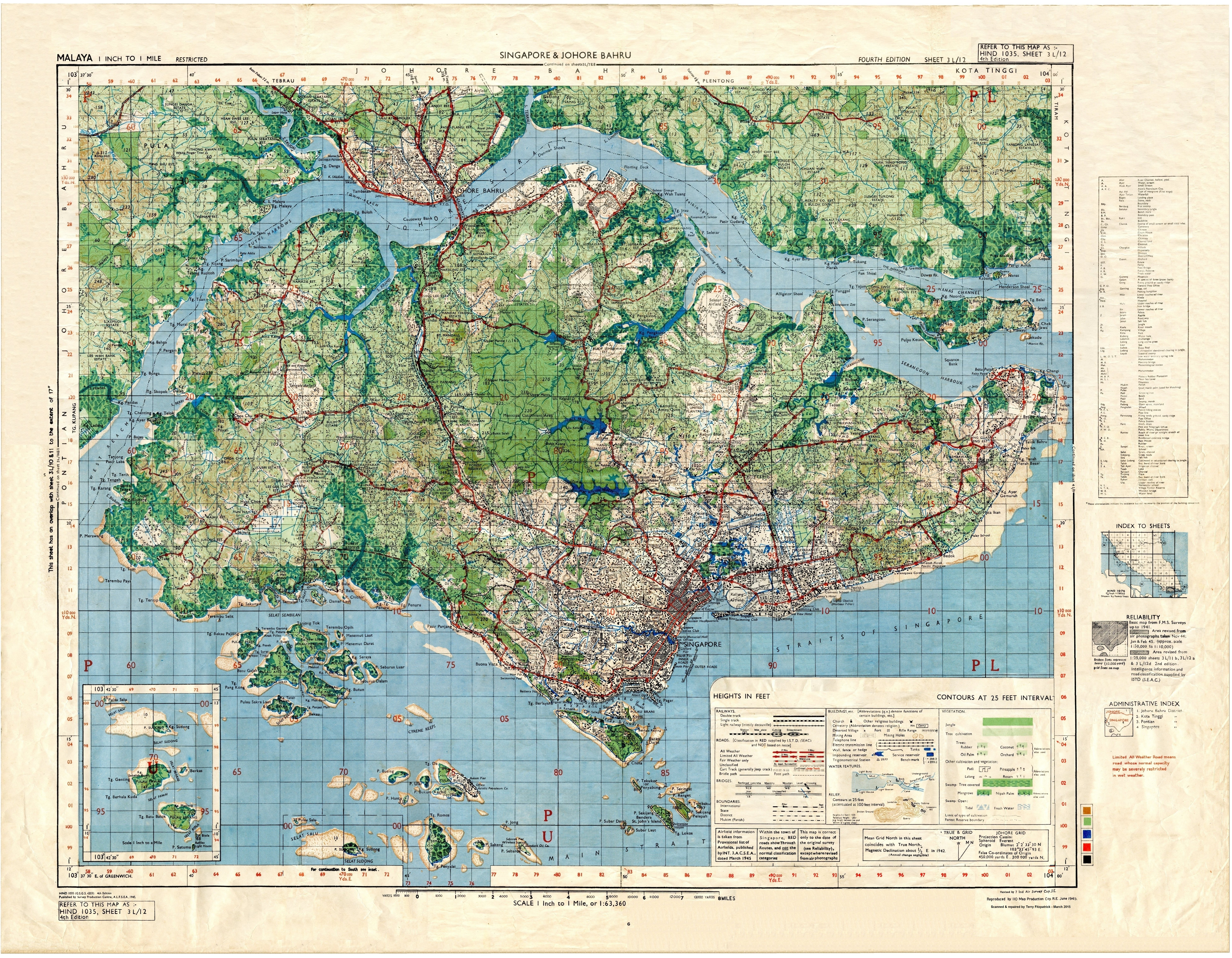
An enlargeable British Military map of Singapore dated 1945

- Singapore is: an island country made up of 63 islands
- Location:
  - Northern Hemisphere and Eastern Hemisphere
  - Eurasia
    - Asia
      - Southeast Asia
        - Indochina
        - Maritime Southeast Asia
  - Time zone: Singapore Standard Time = ASEAN Common Time (UTC+08)
  - Extreme points of Singapore:
    - High: Bukit Timah 163.63 m (537 ft)
    - Low: Singapore Strait 0 m
  - Land boundaries: none (two causeways to Malaysia)
  - Coastline: 193 km (120 mi)
- Population of Singapore: 5,685,807 (2020)
- Area of Singapore: 728.1 km^{2} (281.1 sq mi)
- Atlas of Singapore

=== Environment of Singapore ===
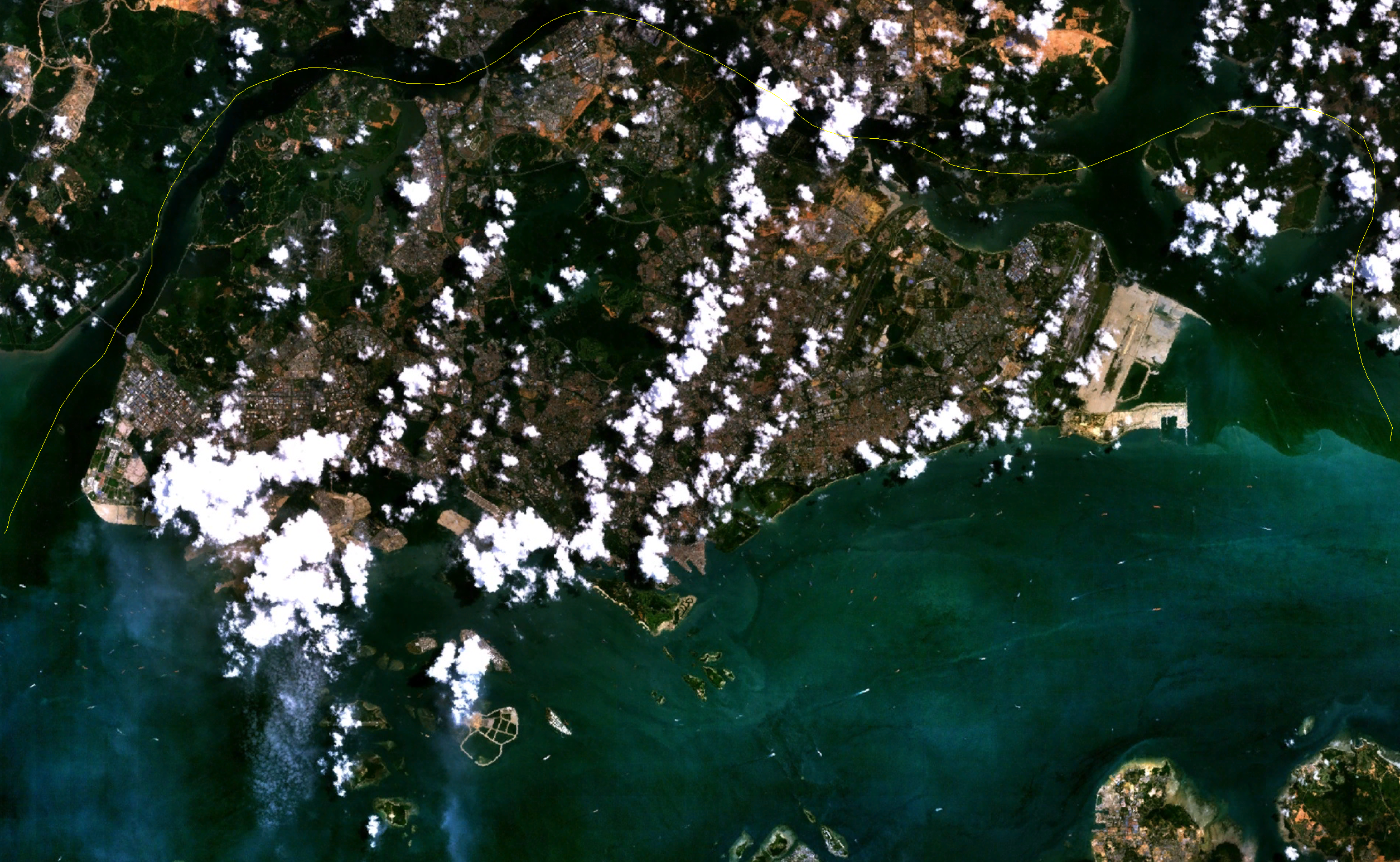
An enlargeable satellite image of Singapore

- Astronomical phenomena
  - Next total solar eclipse visible in Singapore: 5 July 2168
- Biosphere reserves in Singapore
- Climate of Singapore
- Environmental issues in Singapore
- Geology of Singapore
- Wildlife of Singapore
  - Flora of Singapore
  - Fauna of Singapore
    - Birds of Singapore
    - Mammals of Singapore

==== Natural geographic features of Singapore ====
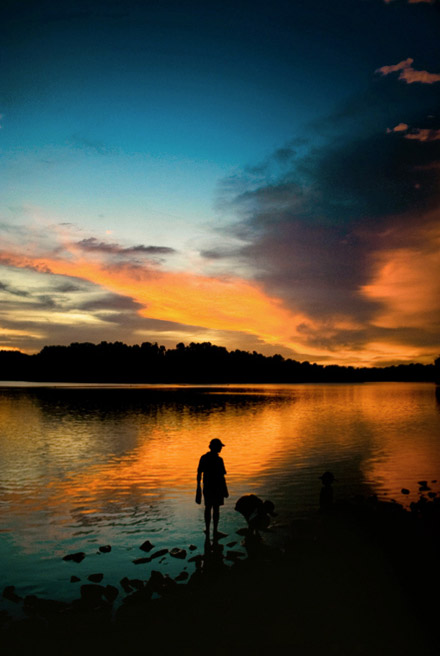
Sunset at Lower Peirce Reservoir, photographed on 25 December 2005

- Hills of Singapore
- Islands of Singapore
- Lakes of Singapore
- Rivers of Singapore

=== Regions of Singapore ===
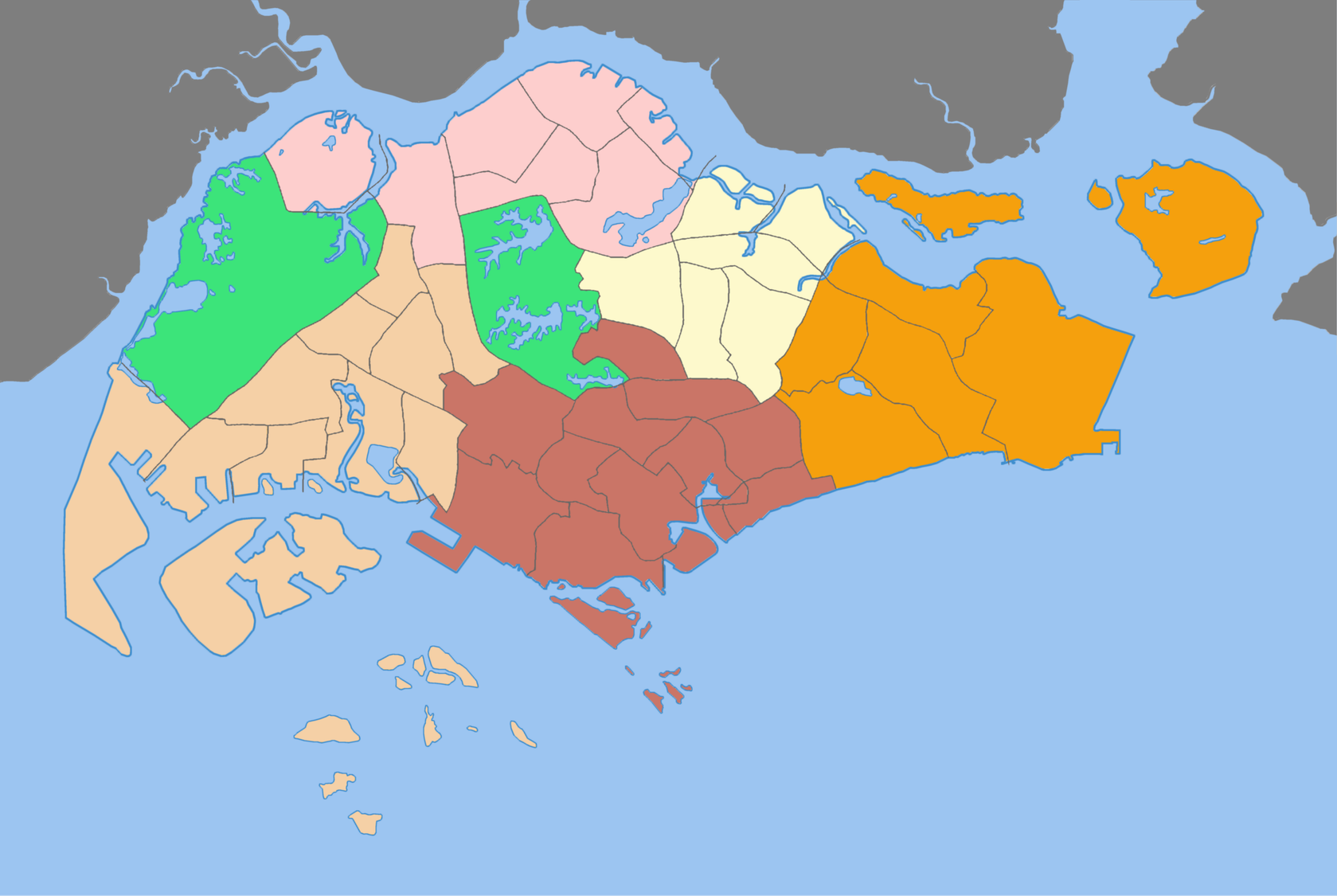
Urban planning areas, an example of subdivisions in Singapore

==== Administrative divisions of Singapore ====
===== Municipalities =====
- Being a city-state, Singapore is both a city and a nation state
  - Singapore is its own only municipality
  - Capital of Singapore: Singapore is its own capital

== Government and politics of Singapore ==
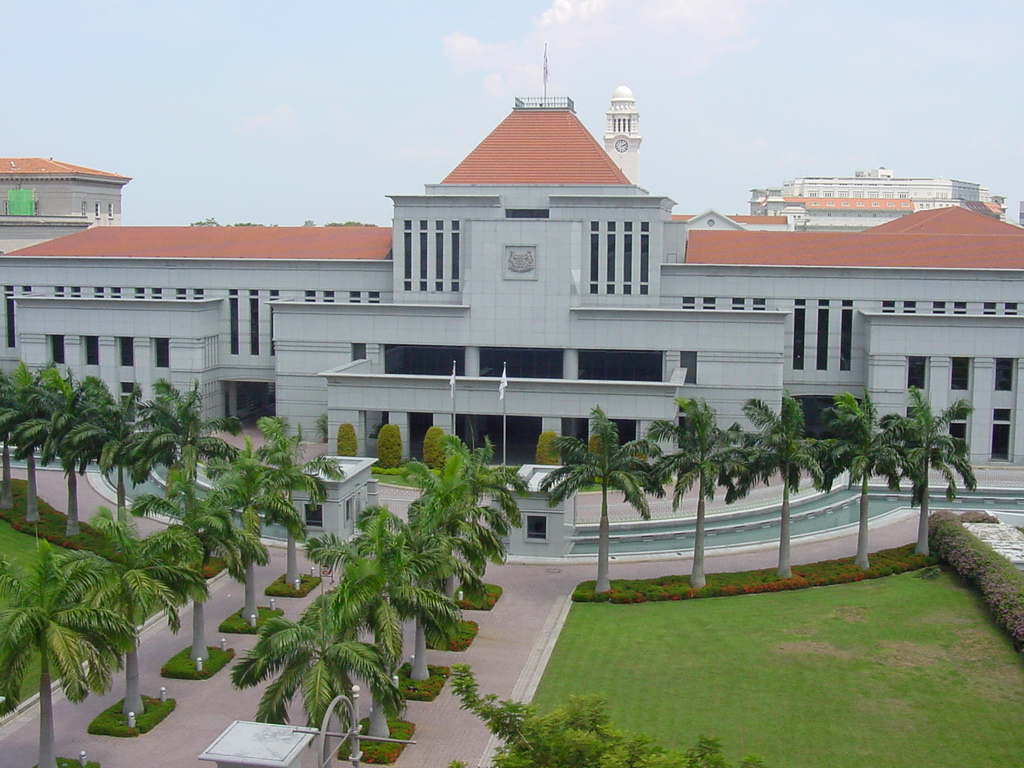
Parliament House, photographed on 18 October 2002

- Form of government: Unitary state under a Parliamentary democracy
- Elections in Singapore
- Political parties in Singapore
- Taxation in Singapore

=== Branches of the government of Singapore ===
==== Executive branch of the government of Singapore ====
- Head of state: President of Singapore, Tharman Shanmugaratnam
- Head of government: Prime Minister of Singapore, Lawrence Wong
- Cabinet of Singapore

==== Legislative branch of the government of Singapore ====
- Parliament of Singapore (unicameral)

==== Judicial branch of the government of Singapore ====
- Judicial officers of the Republic of Singapore
- Supreme Court of Singapore
- Subordinate Courts of Singapore

=== Foreign relations of Singapore ===
- Diplomatic missions in Singapore
- Diplomatic missions of Singapore
- Malaysia-Singapore relations
- Singapore – United States relations

==== International organisation membership ====
The Republic of Singapore is a member of the:

- Asian Development Bank (ADB)
- Asia-Pacific Economic Cooperation (APEC)
- Asia-Pacific Telecommunity (APT)
- Association of Southeast Asian Nations (ASEAN)
- Association of Southeast Asian Nations Regional Forum (ARF)
- Bank for International Settlements (BIS)
- Colombo Plan (CP)
- Commonwealth of Nations
- East Asia Summit (EAS)
- Group of 77 (G77)
- International Atomic Energy Agency (IAEA)
- International Bank for Reconstruction and Development (IBRD)
- International Chamber of Commerce (ICC)
- International Civil Aviation Organization (ICAO)
- International Criminal Police Organization (Interpol)
- International Development Association (IDA)
- International Federation of Red Cross and Red Crescent Societies (IFRCS)
- International Finance Corporation (IFC)
- International Hydrographic Organization (IHO)
- International Labour Organization (ILO)
- International Maritime Organization (IMO)
- International Mobile Satellite Organization (IMSO)
- International Monetary Fund (IMF)
- International Olympic Committee (IOC)
- International Organization for Standardization (ISO)
- International Red Cross and Red Crescent Movement (ICRM)
- International Telecommunication Union (ITU)
- International Telecommunications Satellite Organization (ITSO)
- International Trade Union Confederation (ITUC)
- Inter-Parliamentary Union (IPU)
- Multilateral Investment Guarantee Agency (MIGA)
- Nonaligned Movement (NAM)
- Organisation for the Prohibition of Chemical Weapons (OPCW)
- Pacific Economic Cooperation Council (PECC)
- Permanent Court of Arbitration (PCA)
- Regional Comprehensive Economic Partnership (RCEP)
- United Nations (UN)
- United Nations Conference on Trade and Development (UNCTAD)
- United Nations Educational, Scientific, and Cultural Organization (UNESCO)
- United Nations Integrated Mission in Timor-Leste (UNMIT)
- Universal Postal Union (UPU)
- World Confederation of Labour (WCL)
- World Customs Organization (WCO)
- World Federation of Trade Unions (WFTU)
- World Health Organization (WHO)
- World Intellectual Property Organization (WIPO)
- World Meteorological Organization (WMO)
- World Trade Organization (WTO)

=== Law and order in Singapore ===
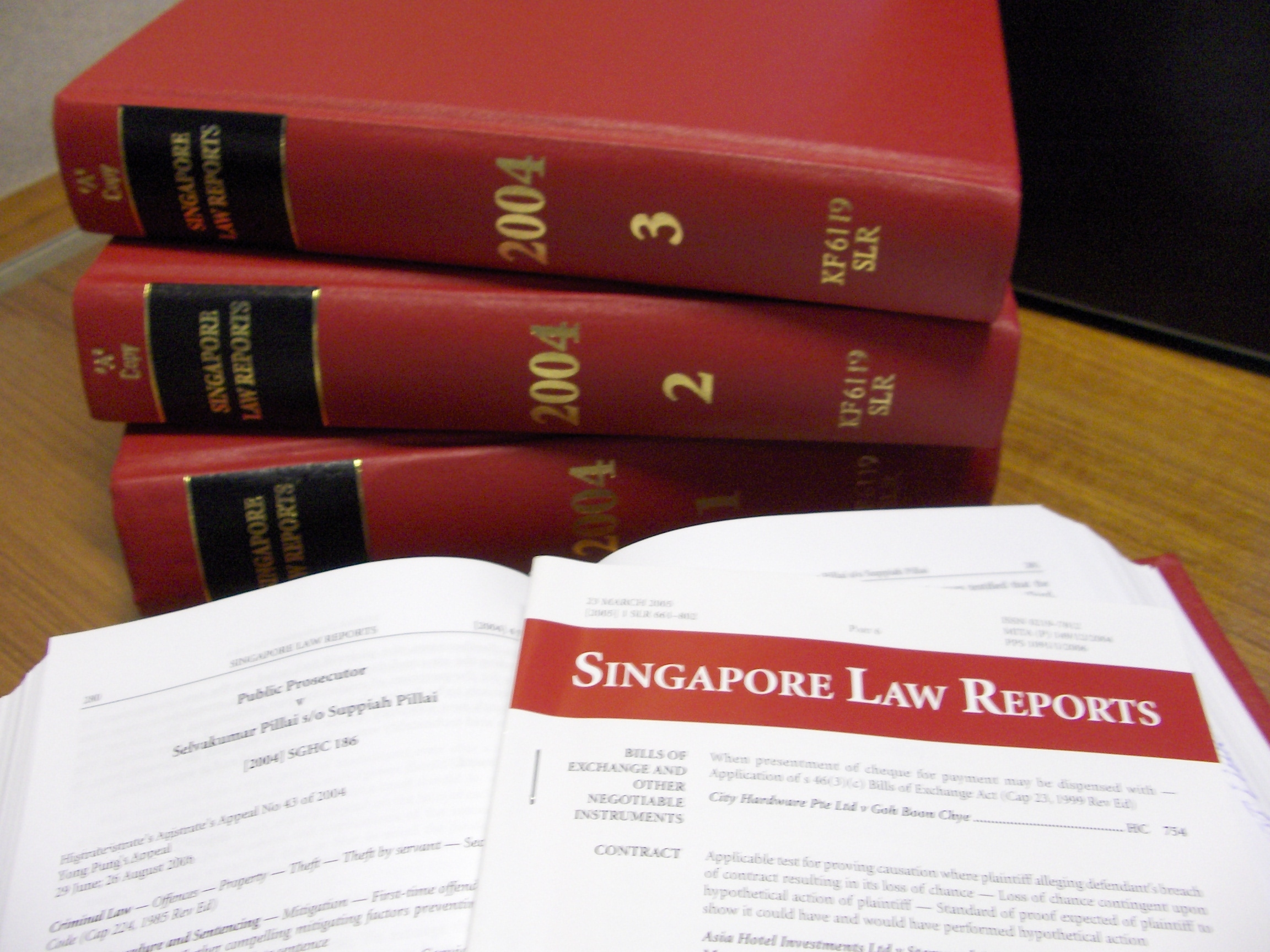
Copies of the Singapore Law Reports at the Library of the Supreme Court of Singapore

- Criminal law of Singapore
  - Capital punishment in Singapore
  - Crime in Singapore
- Constitution of Singapore
- Human rights in Singapore
  - LGBT rights in Singapore
  - Freedom of religion in Singapore
- Law enforcement in Singapore
- Sources of Singapore law

=== Military of Singapore ===
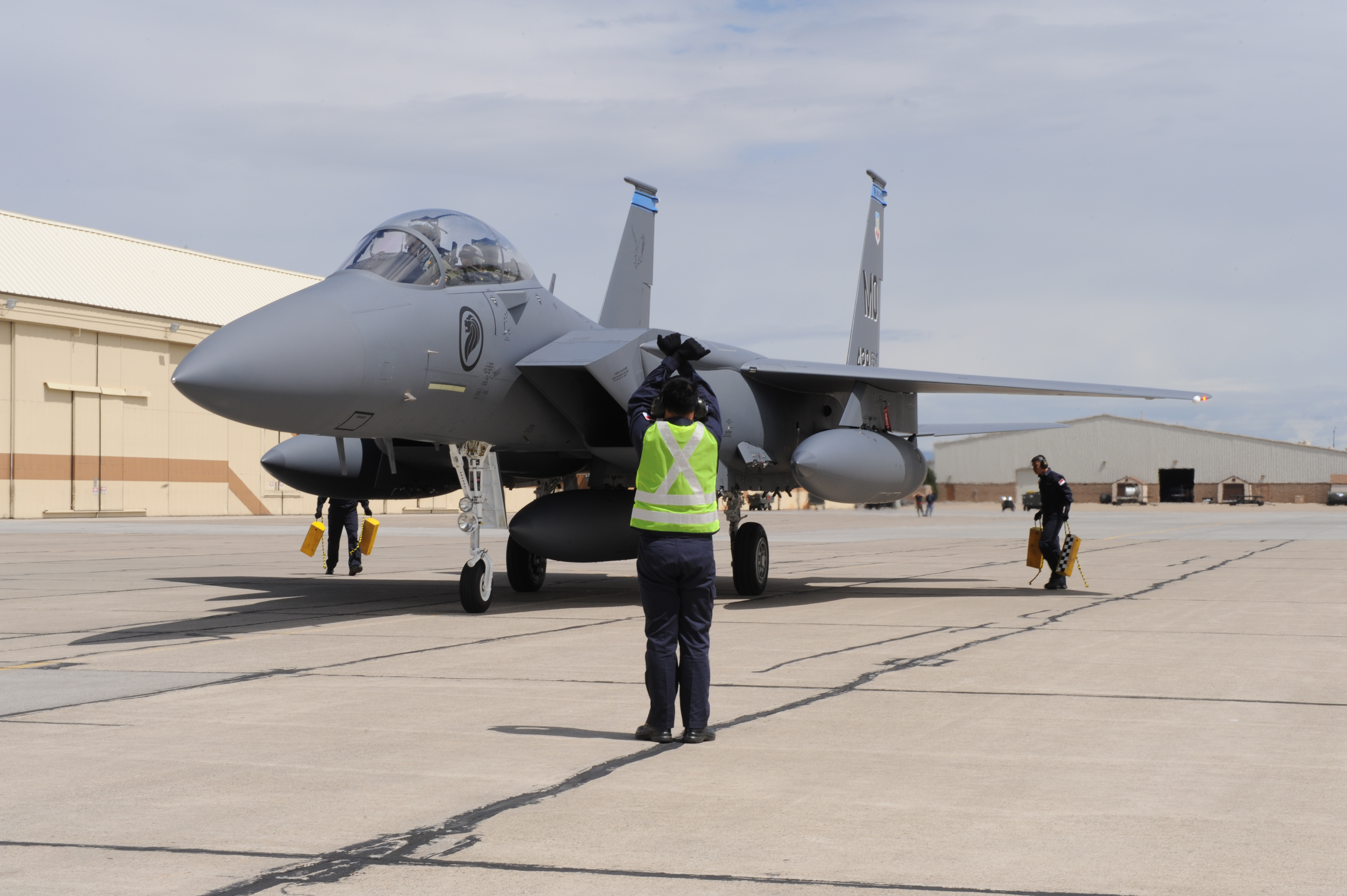
A Republic of Singapore Air Force's F-15SG Strike Eagle

- Singapore Armed Forces
  - Army of Singapore: Singapore Army
  - Navy of Singapore: Republic of Singapore Navy
  - Air force of Singapore: Republic of Singapore Air Force
- Military history of Singapore
- Military ranks of Singapore

== History of Singapore ==
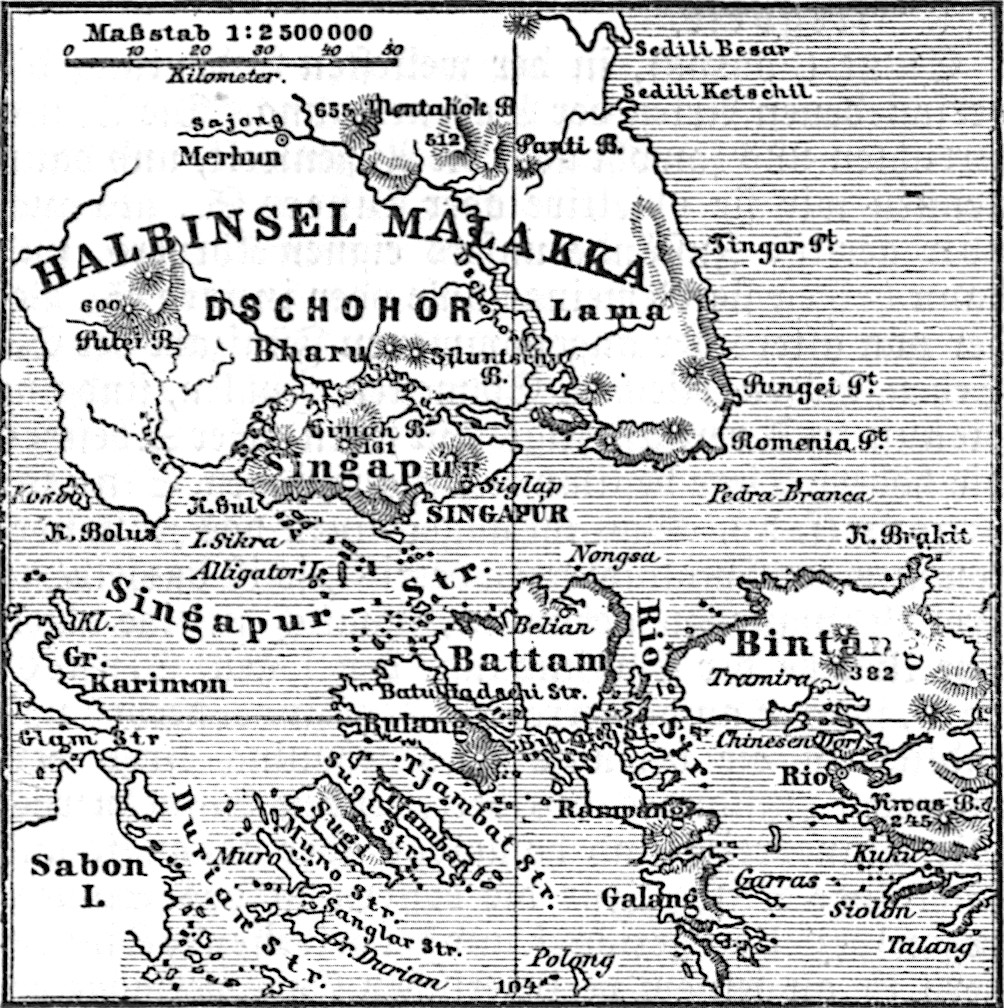
1890 German map of Singapore

- Early history of Singapore (before 1819)
- Founding years of modern Singapore (1819–1826)
- Singapore in the Straits Settlements (1826–1942)
- Japanese occupation of Singapore (1942–1945)
- Post-war Singapore (1945–1959)
- Self-governance of Singapore (1959–1963)
- Singapore in Malaysia (1963–1965)
- History of independent Singapore (1965-current)
- Military history of Singapore

== Culture of Singapore ==
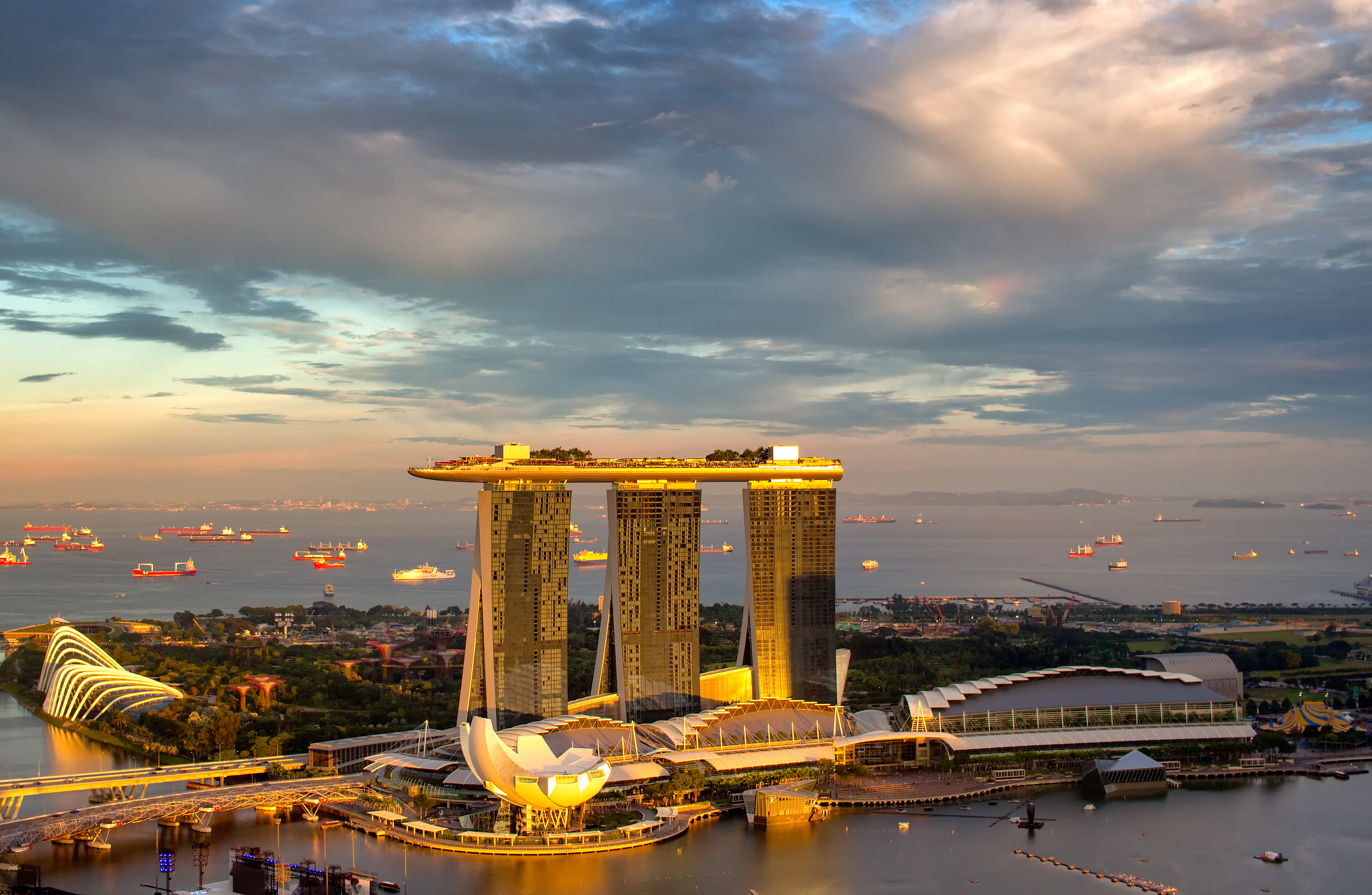
Modern architecture in Marina Bay, Singapore

- Built heritage of Singapore
  - Architecture of Singapore
  - National monuments of Singapore
  - Protected areas of Singapore
  - World Heritage Sites:
    - Singapore Botanic Gardens, since 2015
- Cuisine of Singapore
  - Chinese in Singapore
  - Eurasians in Singapore
  - Indians in Singapore
  - Malays in Singapore
- Festivals in Singapore
- Holidays in Singapore

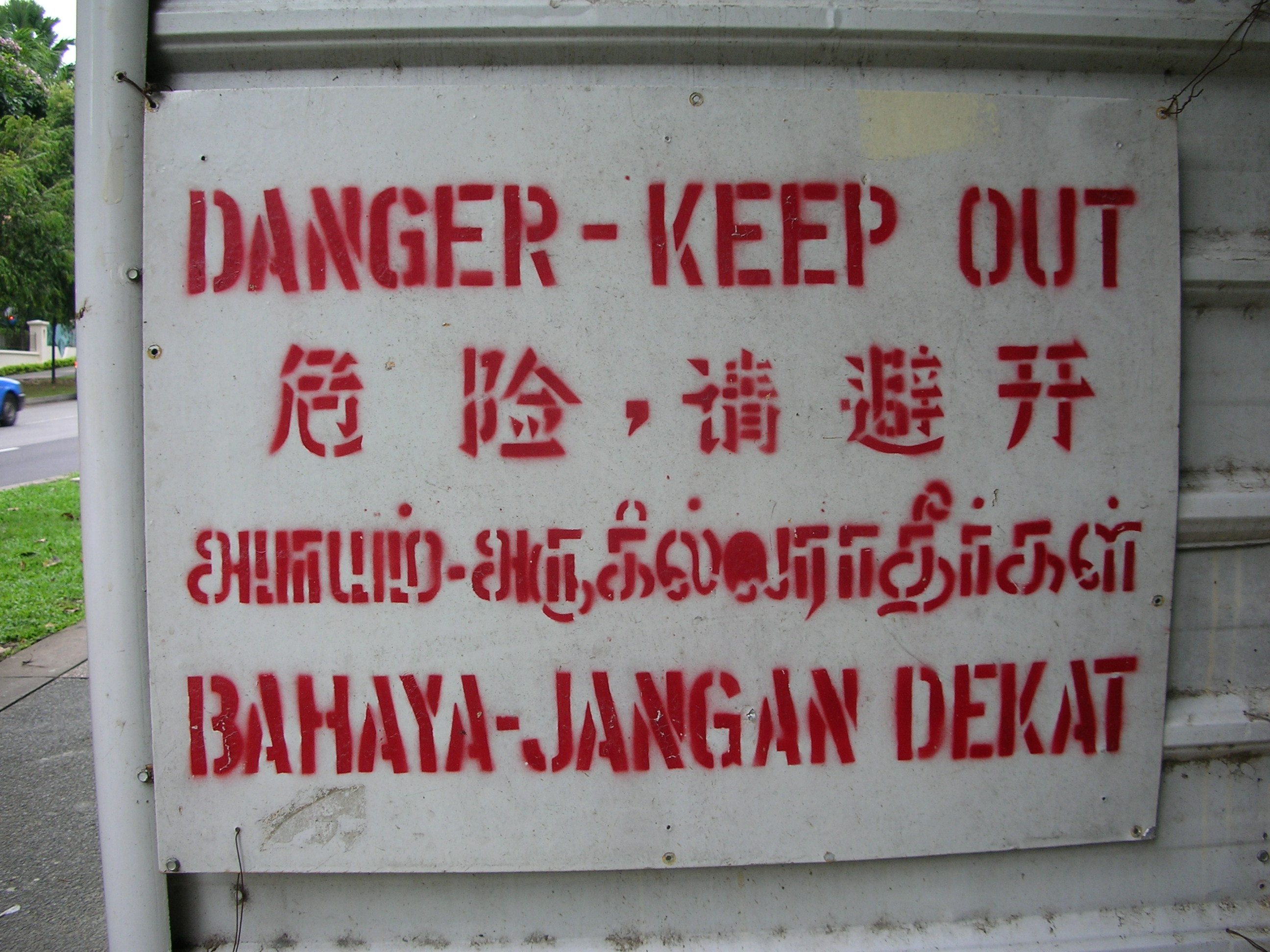
A construction sign written in Singapore's four official languages

- Languages of Singapore
  - English
  - Malay
  - Mandarin
  - Tamil
- Media in Singapore
  - Internet
  - Newspapers
  - Radio
  - Television

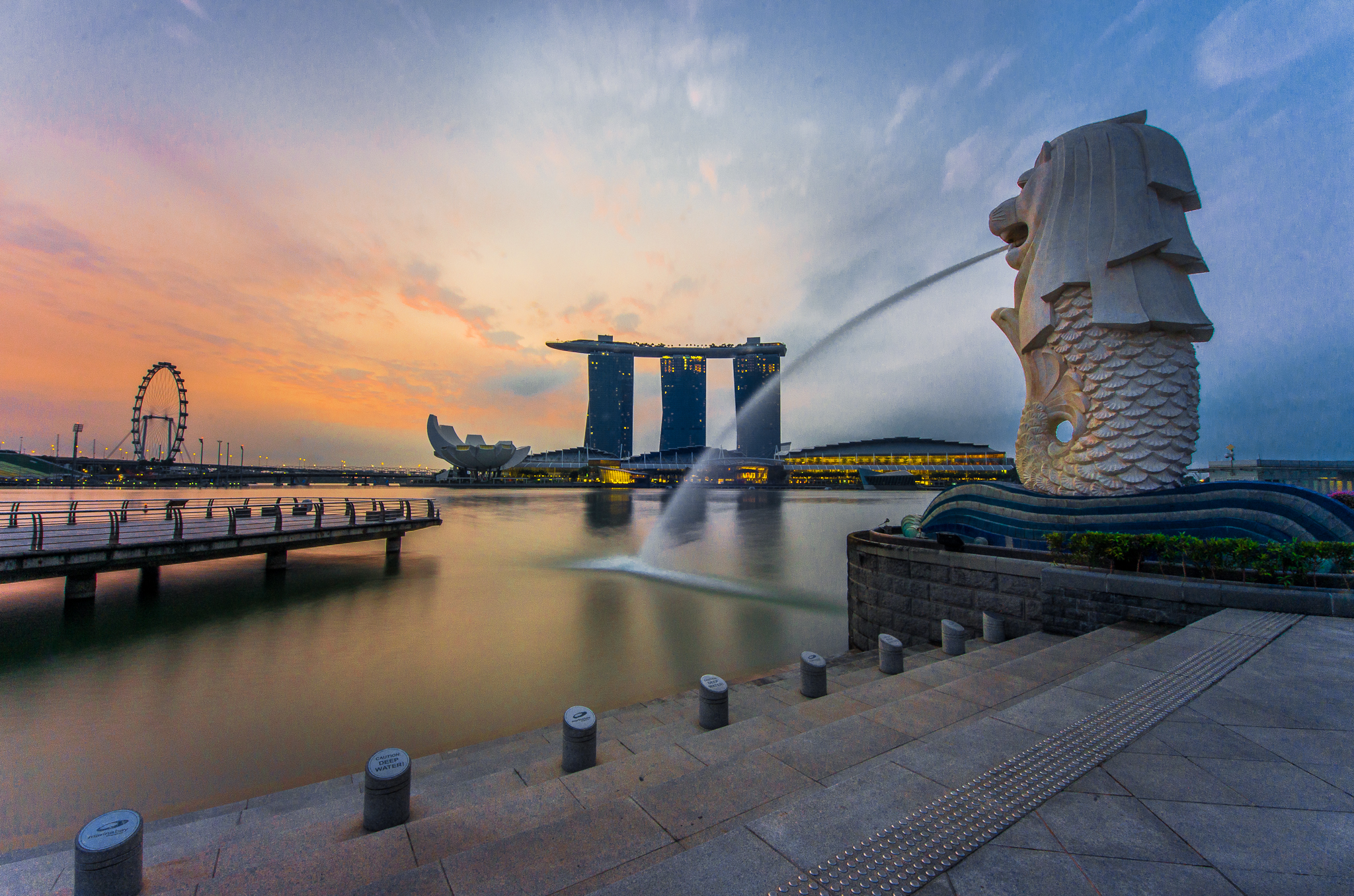
A statue of the Merlion

- National symbols of Singapore
  - Coat of arms of Singapore
  - Lion head symbol
  - Merlion
  - National anthem of Singapore
  - National flag of Singapore
  - National flower of Singapore (Vanda Miss Joaquim)
  - National pledge of Singapore
- People of Singapore
- Prostitution in Singapore

=== Religion in Singapore ===
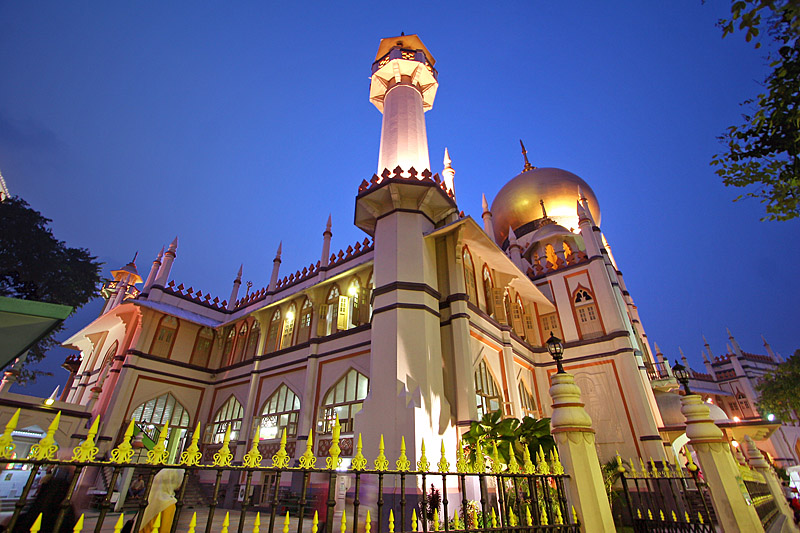
The Sultan Mosque in Kampong Glam

- Freedom of religion in Singapore
- Buddhism in Singapore
- Christianity in Singapore
- Hinduism in Singapore
- Islam in Singapore
- Sikhism in Singapore
- Taoism in Singapore
- Irreligion in Singapore

=== The arts in Singapore ===
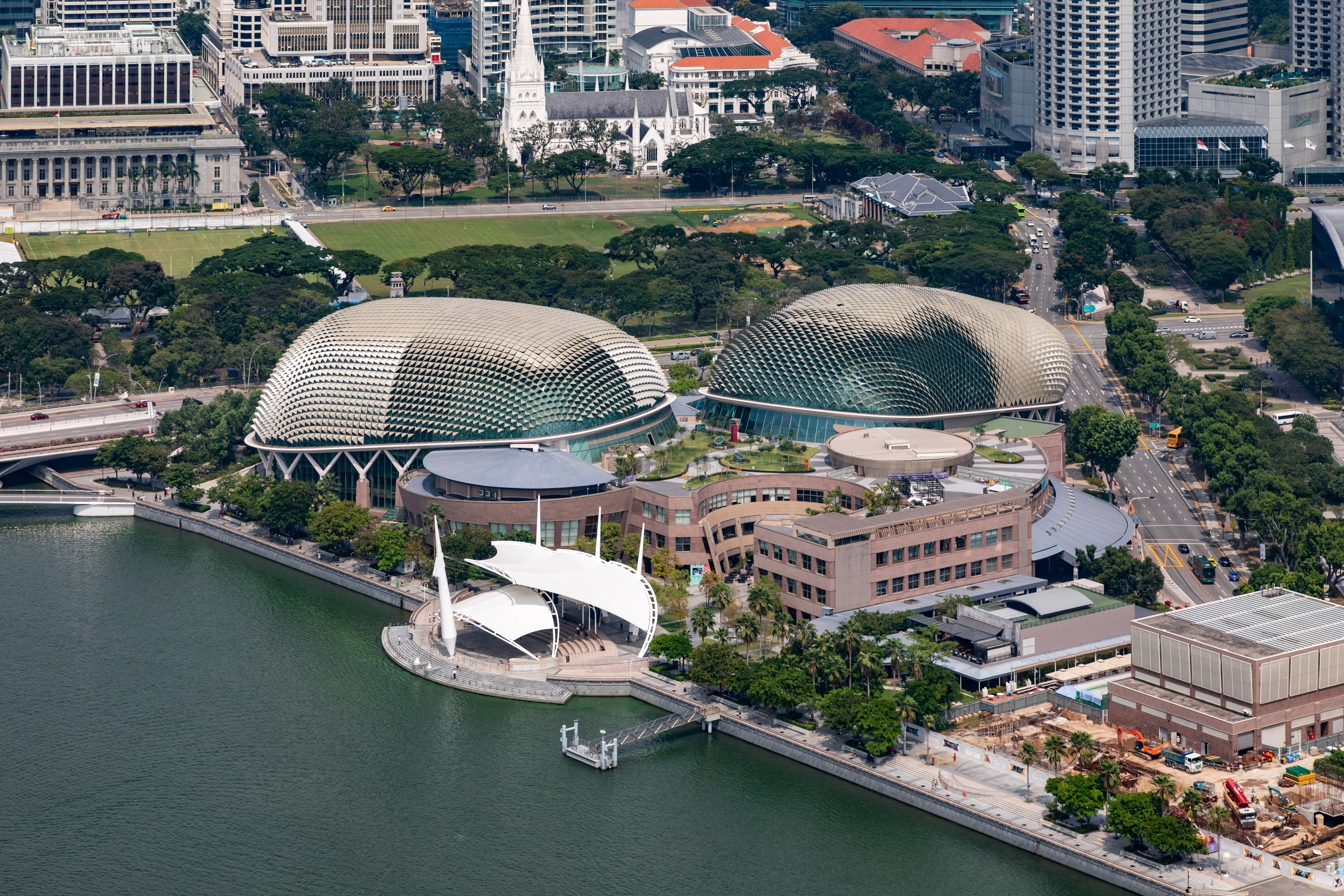
The Esplanade, a performing arts centre

- Visual art of Singapore
- Cinema of Singapore
- Literature of Singapore
- Music of Singapore
- Television in Singapore
- Theatres in Singapore

=== Sports in Singapore ===
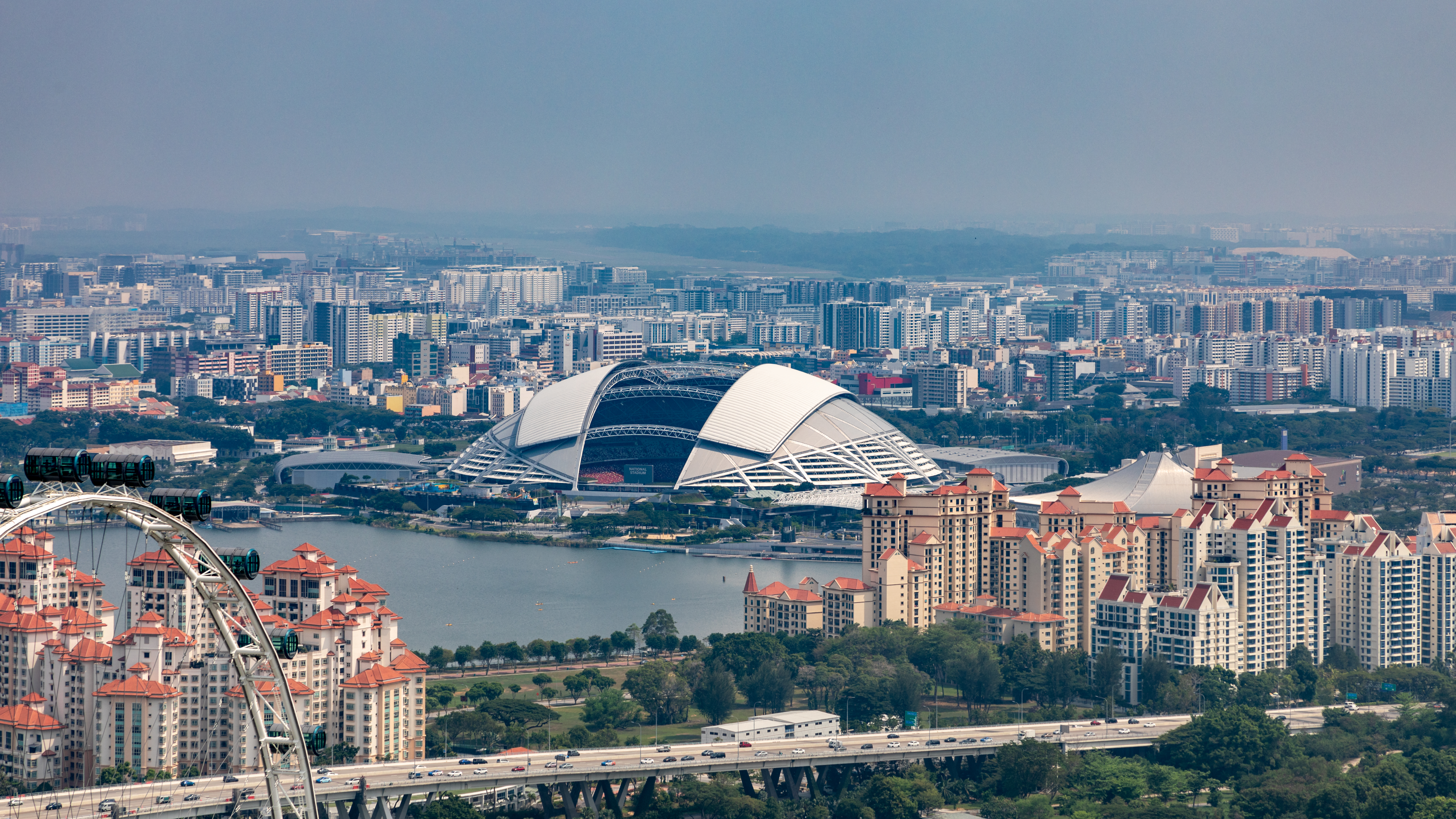
National Stadium, the home stadium of the Singapore national football team

- Football in Singapore
- Rugby union in Singapore
- Singapore Grand Prix
- Singapore at the Olympics
- 2010 Summer Youth Olympics
- National Physical Fitness Award
- Foreign Sports Talent Scheme

== Economy and infrastructure of Singapore ==
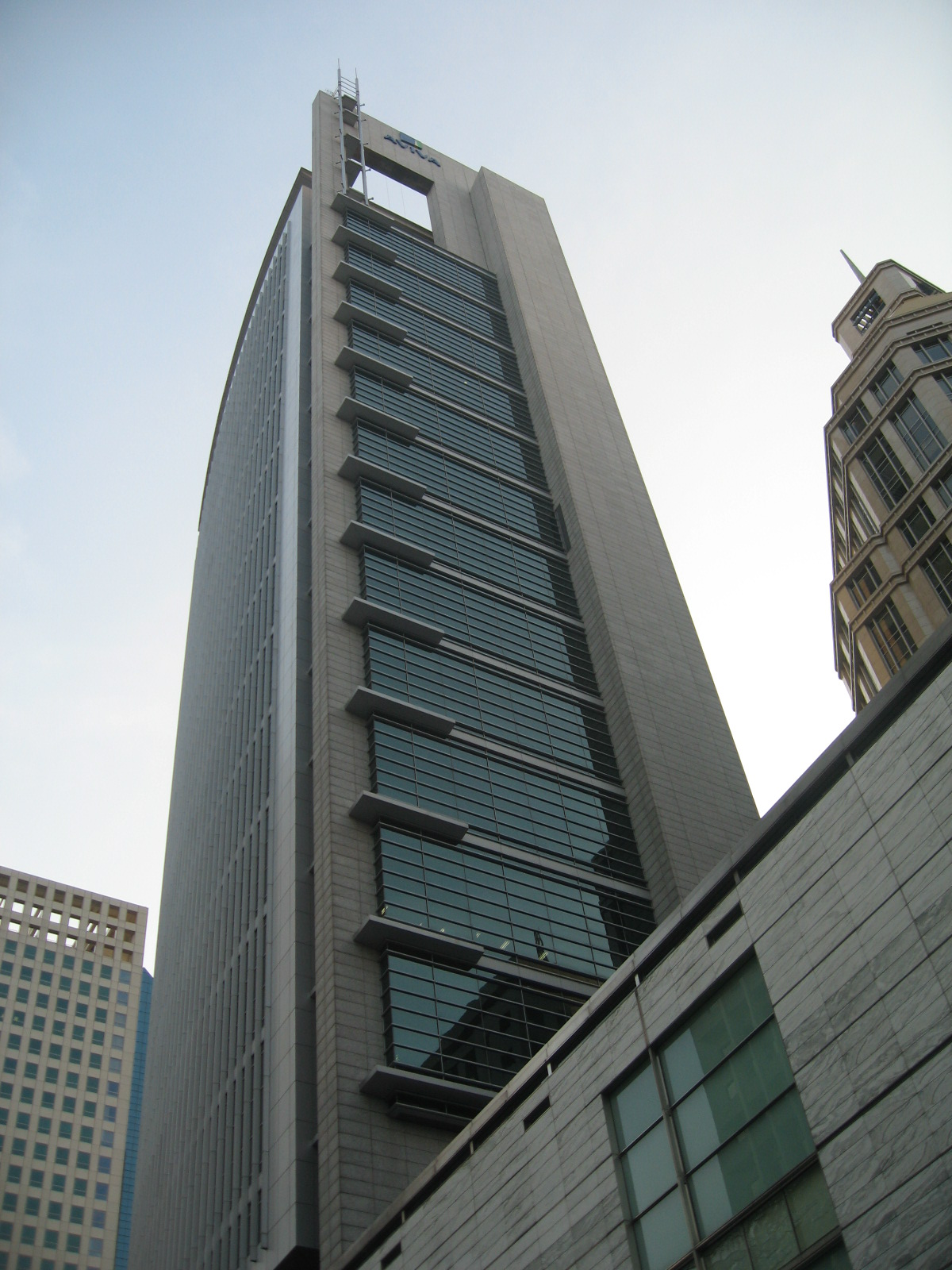
The Singapore Stock Exchange

- Economic rank, by nominal GDP (2007): 45th (forty-fifth)
- Agriculture in Singapore
  - Dairy farming in Singapore
- Banking in Singapore
  - Monetary Authority of Singapore
- Communications in Singapore
  - Internet in Singapore
- Companies of Singapore
- Currency of Singapore: Dollar
  - ISO 4217: SGD
- Energy in Singapore
  - Oil industry in Singapore
- Healthcare in Singapore
- Singapore Exchange
- Tourism in Singapore
  - Visa policy of Singapore
- Water supply and sanitation in Singapore

=== Transport in Singapore ===
- Certificate of Entitlement
- EZ-Link
- Johor-Singapore Causeway
- Ministry of Transport (Singapore)
- Singapore Area Licensing Scheme
- Singapore Cable Car

=== Road transport in Singapore ===
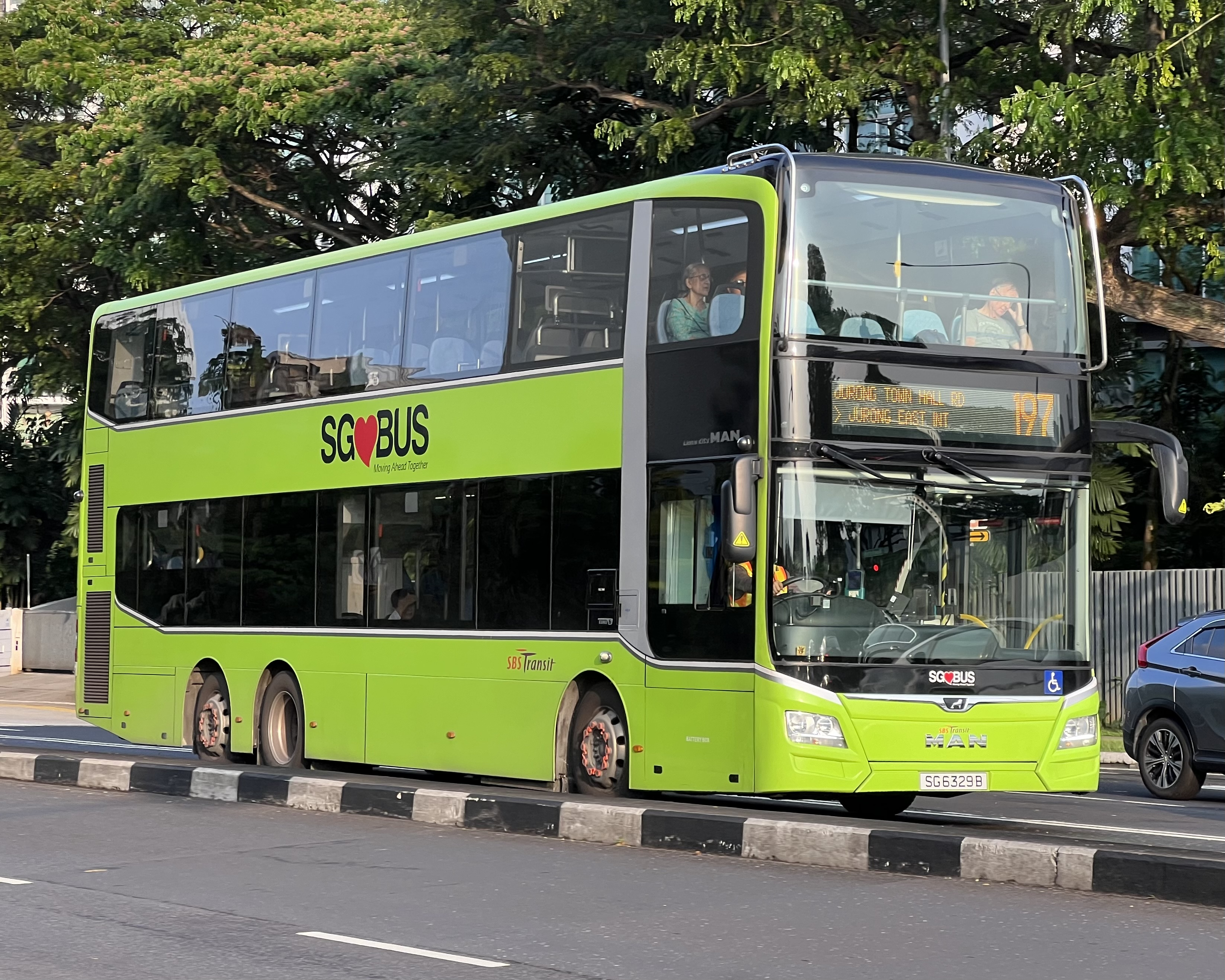
A public bus in Singapore

- Driving in Singapore
- Public buses of Singapore
- Taxicabs of Singapore
- Public Transport Council
- Singapore licence plates
- Expressways of Singapore

==== Aviation in Singapore ====
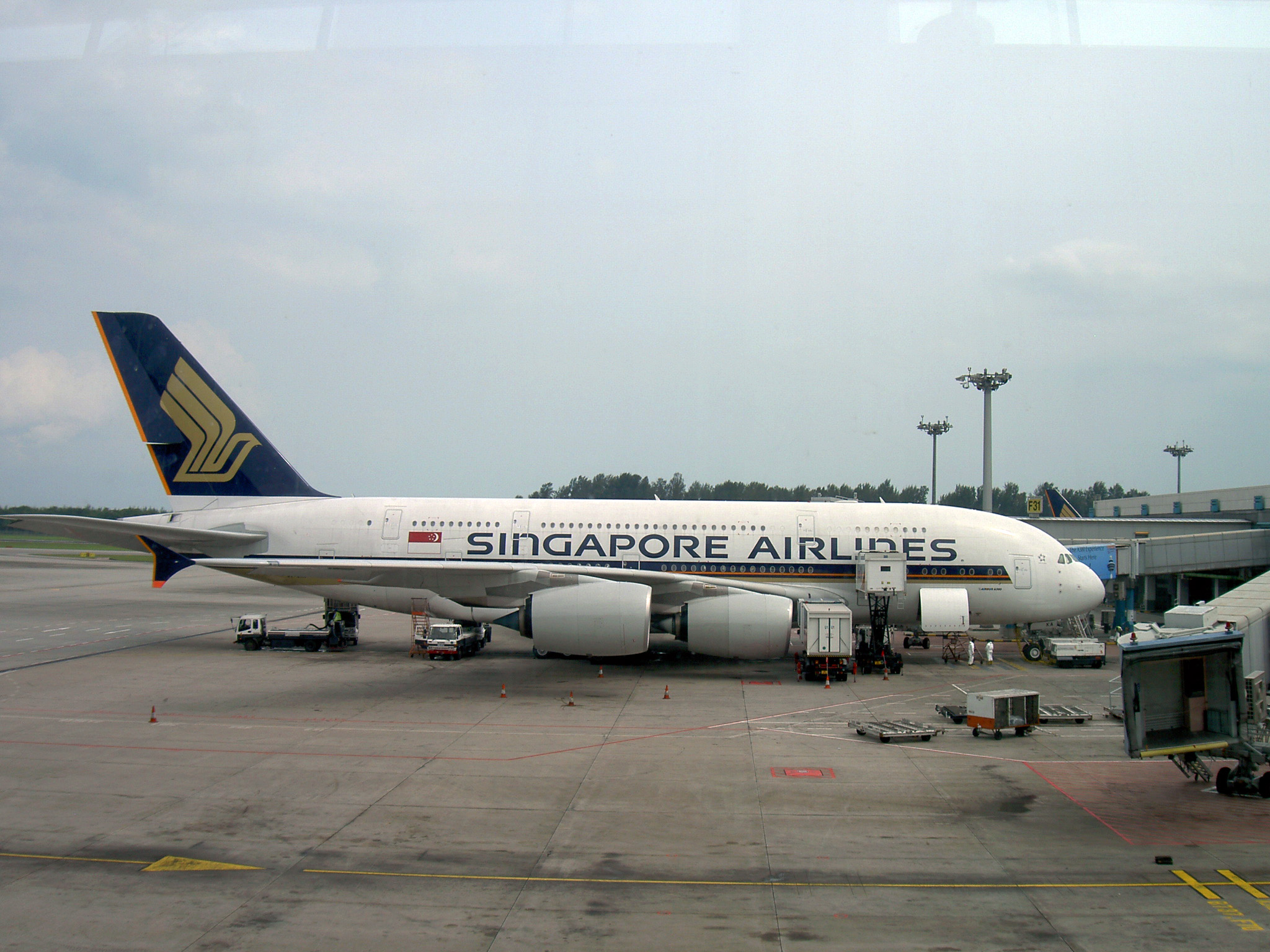
A Singapore Airlines Airbus A380 at Singapore Changi Airport

- Civil Aviation Authority of Singapore
- List of airports in Singapore
- Changi Airport
- Singapore Airshow

==== Rail transport in Singapore ====
A diagram of the physical spread of the MRT and LRT network across the island (includes lines under construction).

- Rail transport in Singapore
- Eastern & Oriental Express
- Keretapi Tanah Melayu

===== Monorails in Singapore =====
- Jurong BirdPark Panorail
- Sentosa Express

===== Light Rail Transit =====
- List of Singapore LRT stations
- Fares and ticketing on the Light Rail Transit
- Bukit Panjang LRT line
- Punggol LRT line
- Sengkang LRT line

===== Mass Rapid Transit =====
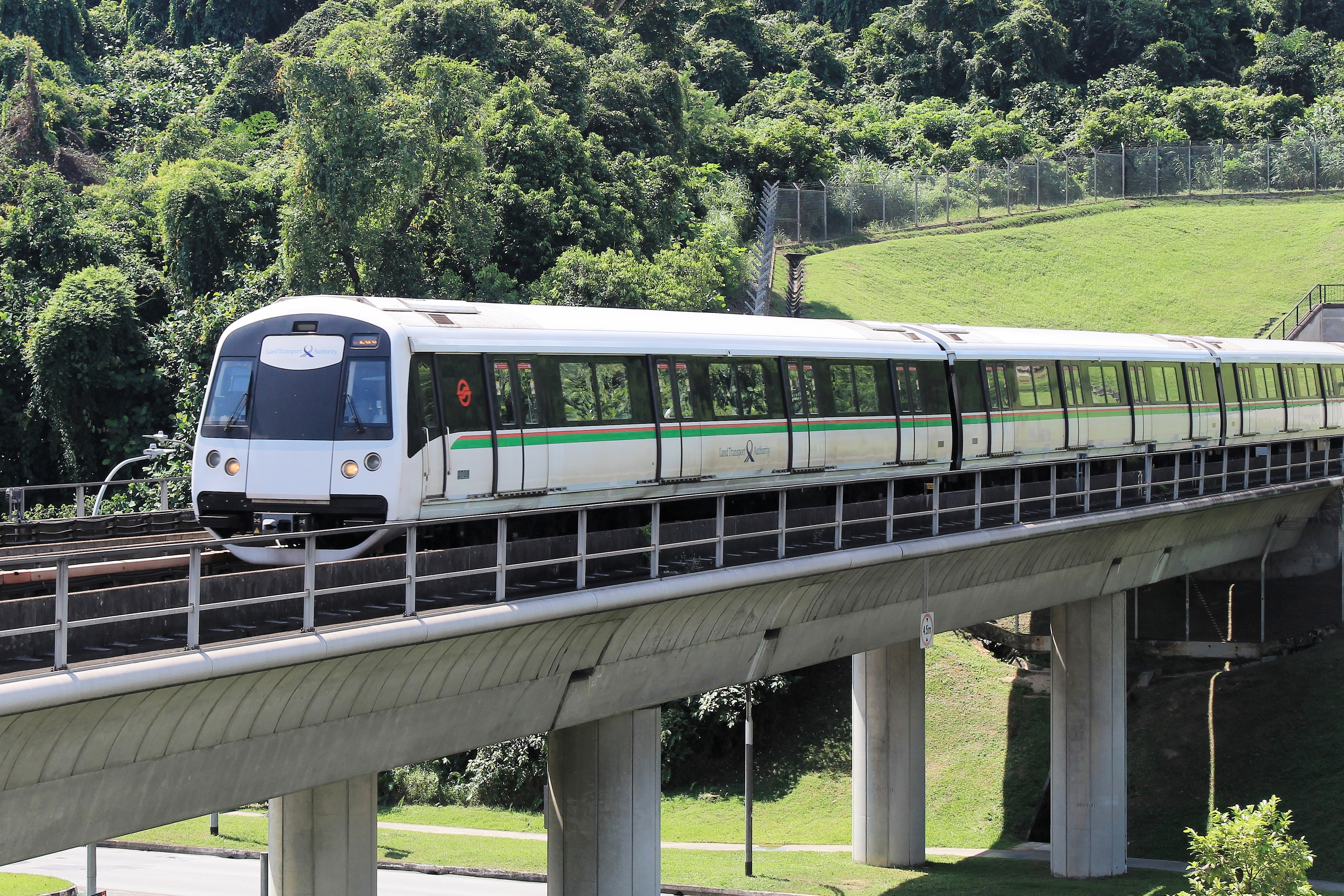
A Mass Rapid Transit train

- Network
  - Circle MRT line
  - Downtown MRT line
  - East–West MRT line
  - North East MRT line
  - North–South MRT line
  - Thomson–East Coast MRT Line
- Fares and ticketing on the Mass Rapid Transit
- History of the Mass Rapid Transit
- Safety on the Mass Rapid Transit
- Security on the Mass Rapid Transit

==== Transport operators of Singapore ====
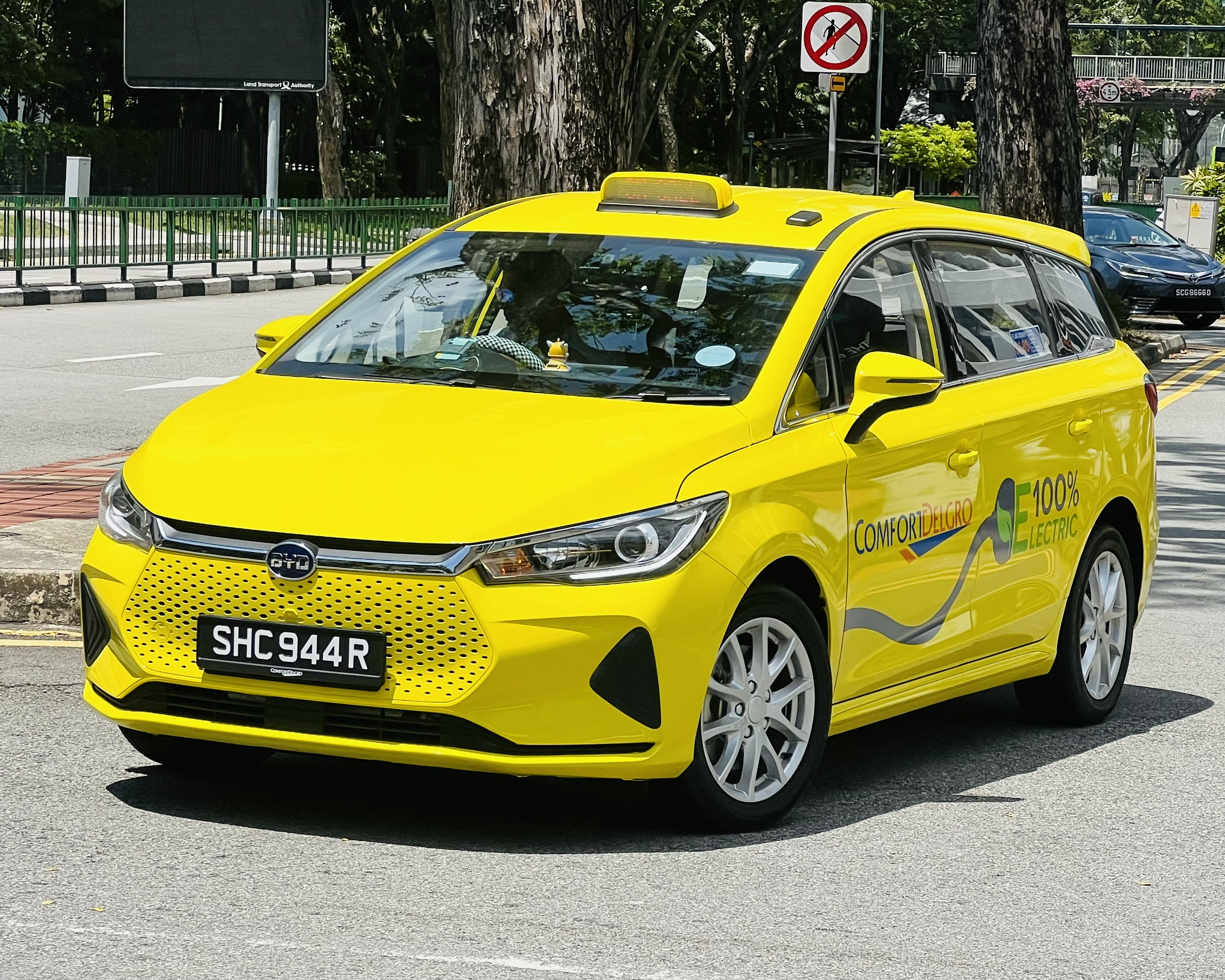
A ComfortDelGro taxi in Singapore.

- ComfortDelGro
- PSA International
- SBS Transit
- SMRT Corporation
- Tower Transit Singapore
- Go-Ahead Singapore

==== Transport disasters in Singapore ====
- Nicoll Highway collapse
- Singapore cable car disaster
- Spyros disaster
- SilkAir Flight 185
- Singapore Airlines Flight 006

== Education in Singapore ==
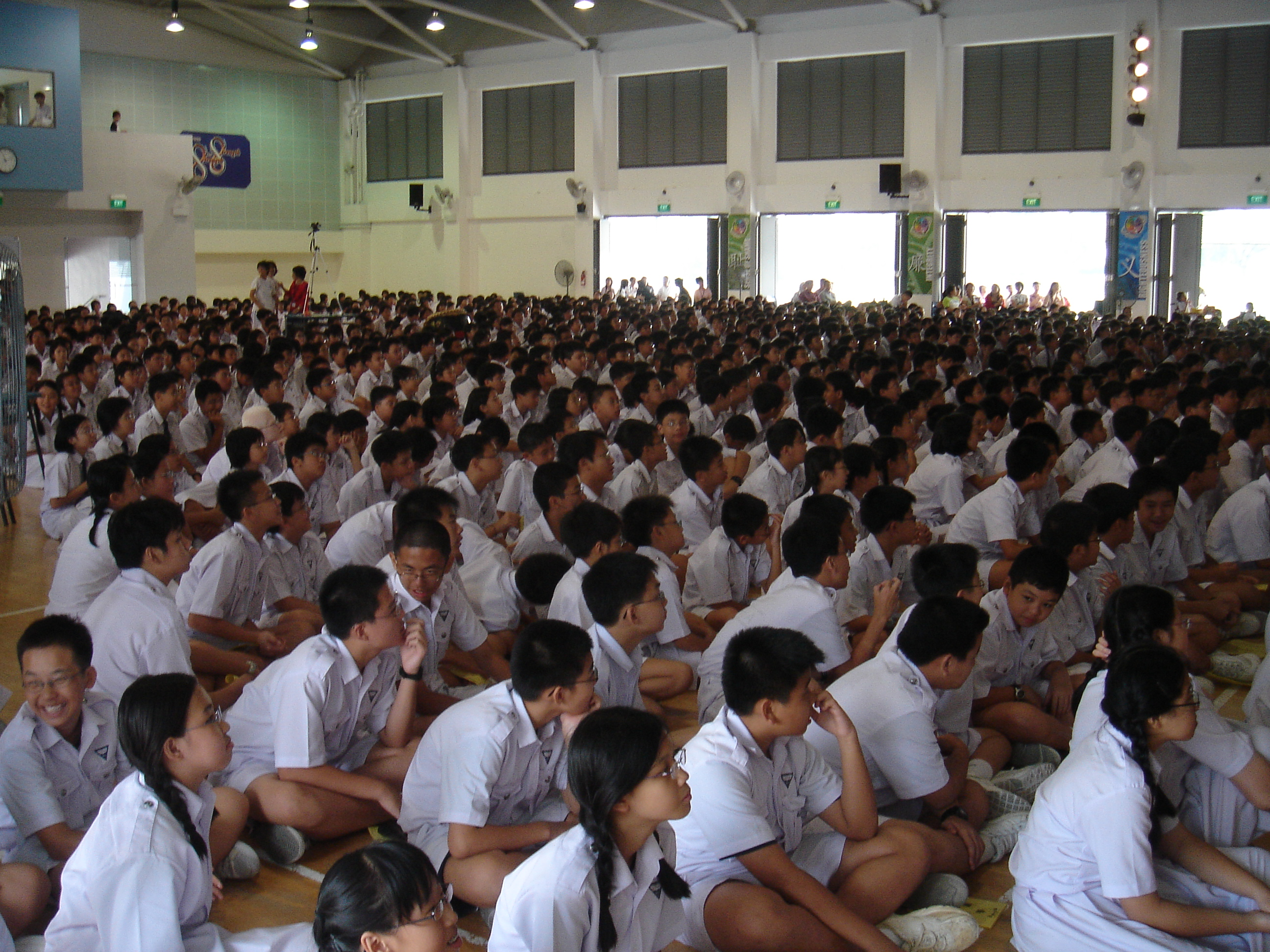
Students in Singapore

- List of schools in Singapore
- List of universities in Singapore
- Gifted Education Programme
- Integrated Programme
- National examinations in Singapore
  - Primary School Leaving Examination
  - GCE O-Level
  - GCE A-Level
- Co-curricular activity

== See also ==
- International rankings of Singapore
- Member state of the Commonwealth of Nations
- Member state of the United Nations
- Outline of Asia
- Outline of geography
