= Dairy farming in Singapore =

Dairy Farming in Singapore was an important agricultural industry in the late 19th to early 20th centuries, as it was the only source of fresh milk for the population, before technological improvements enabled large-scale importation of fresh milk. Today, milk in Singapore is largely imported from Australia and Malaysia, with only one small-scale dairy farm left.

== History ==
The first dairy farmers in Singapore were the Indian dairymen, who were credited as having brought milking to Singapore through the importation of their cattle. The majority of Indians in the cattle trade, including dairymen, mainly resided "within the area bounded by present-day Jalan Besar, Serangoon Road, Sungei Road and Rowell Road". The supply of fresh milk in Singapore came from the dairies operated by these dairymen. The main consumers of milk were the British and the Indians, as milk was not part of the regular diet of the Malay and Chinese population of Singapore, except for the local elites. By the 1960s, up to 75% of the milk produced at the Indian dairy farm was supplied to Indian food and beverage businesses such as restaurants and food kiosks, 20% sold to Indian families, and 5% sold to the Chinese. As such, the price of each pint sold also varied in accordance to the volume purchased, with Chinese customers paying almost double that of Indian customers, until they became regular customers.

=== Daily routine at an Indian dairy farm ===
As depicted in an account of a dairy farm at Potong Pasir: The first round of milking commenced at 2 a.m. and lasted until 4 a.m. This was followed by the manual filling of milk delivery bottles and the making of preparations for distribution by 5 a.m. Next, the cattle were fed "a mixture of sesame cake and broken pulses, red hard crude sugar called gur, and grass." The cattle were fed water from piped water in pails. After the dairymen had eaten their breakfast, some drove the buffaloes to the pond while the cattle remained within the confines of the dairy farm. From 9 am to 11 am, the dairymen threw themselves into the cleaning of the shed floors using water from the river and from piped sources. At noon, pineapple scraps, a component of the feed for cattle, were delivered to the farm. Tasks from here were divided between the unloading of the cargo, bathing of buffaloes, and cleansing of milk bottles and other equipment. The milk bottles were cleansed by "scouring residual milk deposits with a mixture of fine pebbles and water prior to a rinsing in soap suds". After the tasks were completed in an hour, the buffaloes were driven back from the pond, and the cattle were given a second round of feed, which was made up of the pineapple scraps and some grass. The second round of milking was completed by 3 pm, and the buffaloes were allowed to return to the pond again until sunset. The second round of deliveries followed, as well as grass cutters being sent out until night in two trucks to pick grass from numerous spots all over Singapore. At night, the cattle were cleansed once more, and oiled with coconut oil, which functioned as an insect repellent. The cattle were fed one last time in the evening with pineapple scraps mixed with some grass. Cattle which were heavily pregnant or in the early stage of lactation received an extra feed of 230 g of gur. Before turning in for the night, most of the dairymen would drink at least a pint of milk.

=== Issues with fresh milk supply ===
When the British colonised Singapore, they noted that Singapore's tropical climate was ill-suited for pasture, and as such, unsuitable for raising cows. Cows were imported from both Siam and India, with cows from Siam being the source of beef, while cows imported from India provided milk. The cattle used to produce milk were of various breeds of Indian cows and Murra buffaloes. Issues regarding food quality, sanitation and animal welfare plagued the importation of beef cattle, with up to 20% of the beef cattle dying en route to Singapore.

The fresh milk supply from the Indian dairymen were plagued by two issues, the concern of cleanliness of the milk, and the adulteration of the milk. The cleanliness of the milk supplied by the Indian dairymen was greatly unsatisfactory to the British, as they bemoaned the lack of high quality milk and the unsanitary living conditions of the cattle. The milk that was produced was "a thin bluish-white liquid not infrequently flavoured with cow dung and usually speckled with dead flies". Furthermore, the dairymen frequently adulterated milk with unclean water, causing consumers to contract cholera and enteric fever. In 1903, a report published in The Straits Times noted the common sight of Indian dairy cattle feeding on the town garbage that was dumped in Jalan Besar. Public alarm over the unsanitary conditions of the dairy cattle continued to build up over the years, to the point where the municipal authorities got involved. Consequently, the Quarantine and Prevention of Disease Ordinance which had been in effect from 1886 was amended in November 1905 to enact stricter regulations on the dairymen. The dairymen now had to ensure sanitary conditions in their milking sheds, such as well-ventilated spaces, proper drainage and clean water. The tightening of regulations in 1906 was not enough to stop the adulteration of fresh milk, as 77 convictions of adulterated milk were meted out.

=== Alternatives to fresh milk ===
As the adulteration of fresh milk was rampant and became well-known through the numerous reports in newspapers, the well-to-do elites were not inclined to consume it anymore. Instead, alternatives in the form of tinned or powdered milk appealed to not just the elites, but also the general population. Its population could be attested to the importation of "some six million tins of milk, valued at more than a million dollars" into Singapore. Tinned condensed milk acted as a substitute of butter for the Chinese population, who spread it on bread and biscuits. However, the tinned condensed milk was devoid of milk fat, and thus a greatly reduced amount of vitamins A and D. In the case of infants, the Chinese and Malays provided fluid milk either through breast milk, tinned condensed milk or powdered milk. Where they could not afford milk, the Chinese provided rice gruel to the infant.

== Cold Storage Company ==
The establishment of the Cold Storage Company in 1903 was greatly heralded by the British Community, who looked forward to having both fresh beef and dairy products imported from Australia. The operations of Cold Storage's retail store were not spared from setbacks, and it was only in 1910 when the new store was better received. The new store catered to the elites who were mostly European. Dairy products that were available included frozen milk, and fresh butter imported from Australia.

Cold Storage's foray into dairy farming in the early 1930s was made possible after a young Dutchman stole the seeds to a specimen of grass that had been discovered by Dutch scientists working at the Netherlands East Indies Agricultural Research Station in Java. The stolen specimen of grass was a good substitute for grasses found in milder climates. With the thriving and spread of the planted seeds of grass at the 9 1/4 mile off Bukit Timah Road, the next step was to import twelve Friesian cows each from Holland and Australia. The cows were vacuumed frequently and bathed with disinfectants daily. The bathing area helped to ensure the health and welfare of the cattle, as it helped to check any infectious diseases spread by flies and was also well-drained. Each day, the cattle were milked three times manually, with the milk collected sent for chilling in a giant refrigerator. Other facilities to prevent any spread of disease amongst the cattle included quarantine rooms. The droppings of the cattle were also collected on a constant basis, just as the efforts to keep the barns clean were fastidious. The dairy farm was managed by Driebergen, a Dutchman, who also trained the locals working at the farm. Cold Storage's dairy farm was differentiated from dairy farms ran by Indian dairymen through its operations that were founded upon state-of-the-art equipment, hygiene and science. The fresh milk produced from Cold Storage's dairy farm was meant for the consumption of the elites.

== Singapore Dairy Farm Ltd ==
Ownership of Cold Storage's dairy farm was transferred to a new private enterprise, Singapore Dairy Farm Ltd, from 1 July 1932. While the new company managed the farm, Cold Storage continued to be the sole distributor and processor of the milk collected. The number of cattle on the farm were reinforced with importations of cows from Australia or California, with the number of cattle swelling to almost 400 until the Japanese Occupation in 1942. After the initial chaos, the Japanese eventually allowed the farm to re-commence operations, albeit for their own consumption. At the end of the occupation, prior to the arrival of the British troops, approximately more than 200 cows were slaughtered by the Japanese for meat in a bid for a last-minute feast, resulting in approximately 200 cows left. The food control department of the British Military Administration swiftly took over the farm in order to protect the farm and its milk processing equipment from any further looting or damage. With the help of labourers from the Veterinary Department, the farmland was restored and grass for grazing replanted. Preparations were also made for more pure-bred Friesians, Jersey, Ayrshires, Illawarra cows to be imported, and for the original owners to take over the management of the dairy farm. The dairy farm was acquired by the Singapore government in 1976, who compensated Cold Storage $8.3 million for its 75 hectare sized dairy farm. The old site of the dairy farm is now Dairy Farm Nature Park today.
