= Fares and ticketing on the Mass Rapid Transit (Singapore) =

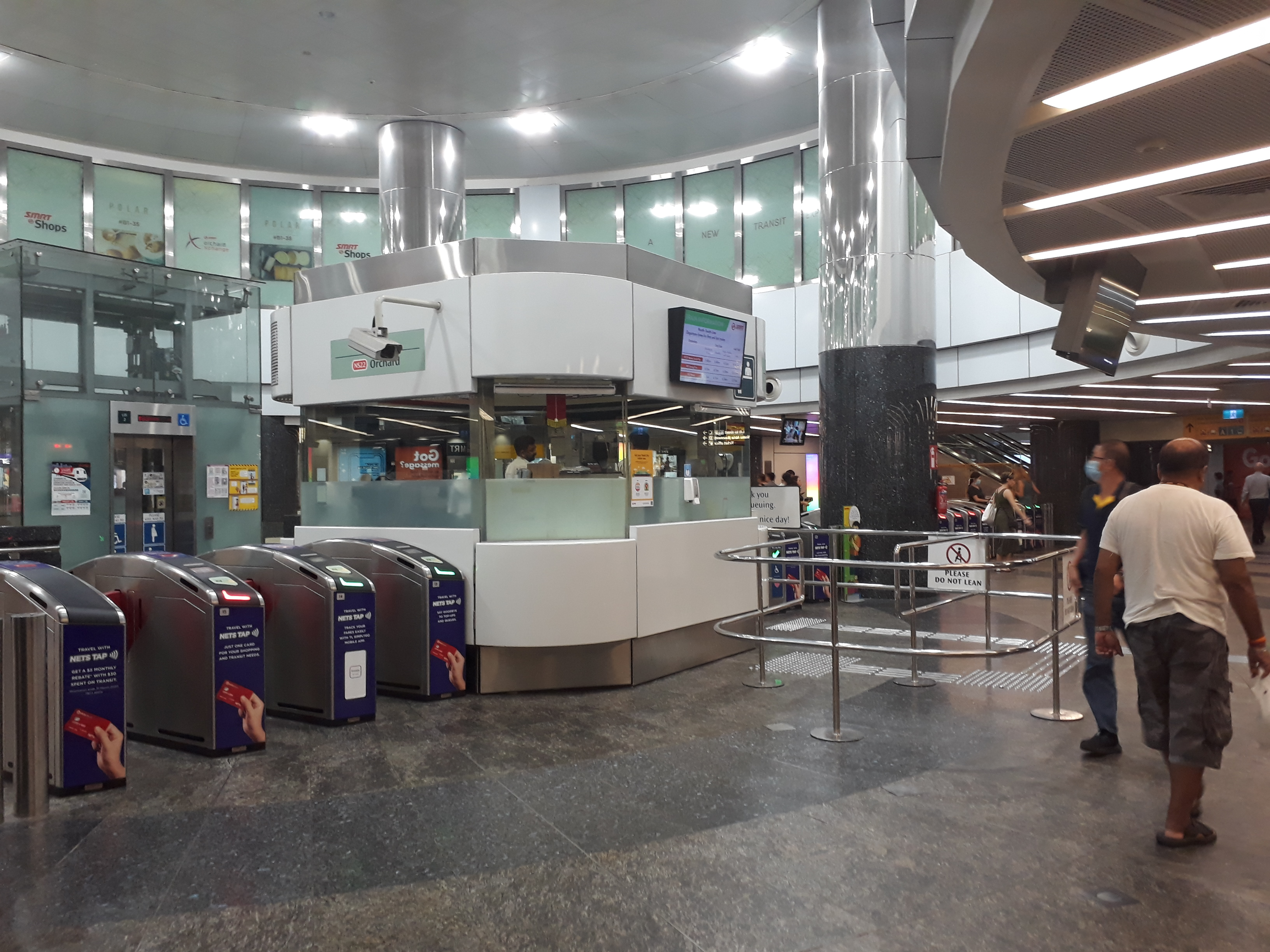
Orchard MRT concourse level with the faregates.

Fares and ticketing on Singapore's public transport system are aimed to break-even or exceed operating expenses. Public transport operators collect fares based on account-based (ABT) and card-based ticketing options, the prices of which are calculated based on the distances travelled between the origin and destination. These prices increase in stages for standard non-concessionary travel, according to the distances travelled. In account-based ticketing, the fare is automatically calculated in the back-end and charged to the passenger post journey. On the other hand, card-based ticketing is proprietary to the transport network and the fare is computed by the system based on the store values recorded in the cards. The public transit system is harmonising towards full ABT.

== Fares ==
Although operated by private companies, the system's fare structure is regulated by the Public Transport Council (PTC), to which the operators submit requests for changes in fares. Fares are kept affordable by pegging them approximately to distance-related bus fares, thus encouraging commuters to use the network and reduce heavy reliance on the bus system. A fare review is conducted every year, based on a formula that itself is reviewed every 5 years. Since 2021, fare formula has been revised such that there is no Network Capacity Factor (NCF) involved, but the NCF for 2021 only has January 2020 data. The formula takes into account the main factors affecting the cost of operating the public transport system, including the MRT and public buses. Fare increases have caused public concern, but fares have been reduced in 2009, 2010, 2015, 2016 and 2017. Historically, fares on the fully underground North East, Circle, and Downtown lines had been higher than those of the North–South and East–West lines (NSEWL), a disparity that was justified by citing higher costs of operation and maintenance on a completely underground line. However, the Public Transport Council (PTC) announced in 2016 that fares for the three underground lines would be reduced to match those on the NSEWL, which took effect along with the annual fare review, on 30 December 2016.

After the opening of Downtown Line Stage 3, Transport Minister Khaw Boon Wan announced that public transport fare rules will be reviewed to allow for transfers across MRT lines at different stations due to the increasing density of the rail network. At the time, commuters were charged a second time when they made such transfers. He added that the PTC would review distance-based fare transfer rules to ensure they continue to facilitate "fast, seamless" public transport journeys. The review of distance-based fare rules on MRT lines was completed, and a waiver on the second boarding fee incurred when making such transfers was announced on 22 March 2018. The scheme was implemented on 29 December 2018.

Children under the age of 4 and below the height of 0.9m travels for free. Children under the age of 7 can travel for free using a child concession card.

After short-term concessionary travel expires, the following measures are being done:

- Secondary school students progressing to ITE/Polytechnic will have the concessionary period extended for four more months upon completion of studies until they receive their ITE/Polytechnic Concession Card.
- Secondary school students will have the concessionary period extended for the entire duration if going to junior college/pre-university.
- ITE students from 1 January 2023 will continue to have concessionary fares extended for four more months until you pursue a full-time studies (e.g. Nitec to Higher Nitec, Higher Nitec to Work-Study Diploma or normal diploma).
- Graduating polytechnic students and A Level students after the expiry of concession will have to pay adult fares (and hence no concession fares for all university students), because male citizens are not allowed to defer to pursue degree courses and more than 90% of the undergraduates are eligible voters.

The only long-term concessionary travel is Passion Silver Card, Persons with Disabilities Card and Workfare Transport Concession Card.

=== Bus Fare ===
Type	Fares					
Type	Adult	Senior Citizen	Persons with Disabilities	Student	Workfare Transport Concession	Children under 0.9m/under age 7
Feeder	$1.28	$0.69		$0.52	$0.78	FREE
Basic/Trunk	$1.28 - $2.57	$0.69 - $1.07		$0.52 - $0.78	$0.78 - $1.87	FREE
Express	$2.28 - $3.57	$1.34 - $1.72		$1.02 - $1.28	$1.48 - $2.57	FREE
Premium	$3.00 - $6.00					

== Transfer Rules ==
In order for a valid transfer, the following conditions must be met:

- All journeys must be within 2 hours of the first boarding (on the same journey).
- Maximum of 5 transfers can be made within a journey.
- 45 minutes for transfers between rail station and bus service, or between different bus services.
- 15 minutes for transfers between different rail stations.
- Current bus service must not be the same number as the preceding bus service.
- Terminating trip for dual-loop feeders service and transfer to its non-terminating trip at respective interchange will consist as a single trip.
- No exit and re-entry at the same station (15 minutes for transfer at Bukit Panjang, Choa Chu Kang, Newton and Tampines stations).

== Ticketing ==
Main articles: EZ-Link, NETS, and CEPAS

=== Tickets ===
Fares can be paid via stored value travel cards (e.g. EZ-Link), bank cards (e.g. credit/debit cards, mobile wallets), or tourist passes. The ticketing system is developed based on the Contactless e-Purse Application (CEPAS) standard. The Symphony for e-payment (SeP) is the backend processing and clearing system for public transit. "SeP 2.0" allows smartcards, credit card and debit card that complies with the CEPAS standard to be used within the system and a wide variety of payment applications. "SeP 2.0" has permitted EZ-Link, NETS, American Express (AMEX), Mastercard and VISA to provide for e-payment services.

The ticketing system currently utilises a mixture of Account-Based Ticketing (ABT), or "SeP 2.0", and legacy (non-ABT) card-based options. ABT has eliminated the need for top-ups.

Fares are charged based on commuters "tapping in" their payment cards, upon entering their mode of transport, at the origin or outset of the journey, and "tapping out" upon exit at the destination. The use of different cards during boarding and alighting, or the failure to tap out, will generally result in full or flat fare(s) charged to the user's account. Furthermore, fare evasion is subject to a penalty of S$50.

The current status of the ticketing methods for public transit are tabulated below:

CEPAS Version	Methods^{1}	Features	Authorised Sources	Validity^{2}	Ref
3.0	Credit Card	Account-based, transacts via contactless payment with a credit facility.	Banks	Stated on Card	
3.0	Debit Card	Account-based, transacts via contactless payment with a debit facility.	Banks	Stated on Card	
3.0	ATM Card	Account-based, transacts via contactless payment with a bank account.	Banks	Per terms of service	
3.0	Mobile Devices	Mobile payment via ApplePay, Google Pay, Samsung Pay, Fitbit Pay or Garmin Pay with a compatible NFC enabled mobile device.	E-wallet payment service providers	Per terms of service	
2.0 (Purple/Blue)	EZ-Link	Card-based, can be upgraded to SimplyGo at Station Machines^{5}, tops up at Station Machines^{3} or ATMs, displays fares and balances at station gates or bus readers, permits retail and motoring use.	Convenience Stores (7-11, Cheers, Buzz)	5 years from date of purchase, or 10 October 2028, whichever is earlier	
3.0 (Yellow)	EZ-Link	Account-based, pairs with SimplyGo App, tops up at Station Machines or SimplyGo App^{4}, auto top up via Giro, permits retail use.	Ticketing Offices, Convenience Stores (7-11, Cheers, Buzz)	5 years from date of purchase	
2.0 (Purple/Blue)	NETS FlashPay	Card-based, can be traded in at Ticketing Offices for NETS Prepaid Card, tops up at Station Machines, ATMs, or NETS App, displays fares and balances at station gates or bus readers, permits retail and motoring use.	Convenience Stores (7–11, Cheers, Buzz), NETS customer service, Lazada and Shopee platforms.	7 years from date of purchase, or 10 October 2028, whichever is earlier.	
3.0 (Yellow)	NETS Prepaid	Account-based, pairs with NETS App, tops up at Convenience Stores (7–11), NETS App or NETS website, permits retail use.	Ticketing Offices, Convenience Stores (7–11, Cheers, Buzz), NETS customer service, Airport & Ferry Terminals, Lazada and Shopee platforms.	5 years from date of purchase	
2.0 (Purple/Blue)	Concession Card	Card-based, can be upgraded to SimplyGo at Station Machines, tops up at Station Machines^{3} or ATMs, displays fares and balances at station gates or bus readers, concessionary travel, or purchase of one month's unlimited rides for a discounted fee, as applicable to prescribed categories, permits retail and motoring use.	Institutions (Primary, Secondary, ITE, JC and Polytechnic); Apply via SimplyGo app (Persons with Disabilities, Workfare Transport, Passion Silver, Adult Monthly Travel Card); Ticket office for card replacement Ticket office by bringing birth certificate (Child Concession Card)	Per eligibility status	
3.0 (Yellow)	Concession Card	Account-based, pairs with SimplyGo App, tops up at Station Machines or SimplyGo App^{4}, auto top up via Giro, permits retail use.	Institutions (Primary, Secondary, ITE, JC and Polytechnic); Apply via SimplyGo app (Persons with Disabilities, Workfare Transport, Passion Silver, Adult Monthly Travel Card); Ticket office for card replacement Ticket office by bringing birth certificate (Child Concession Card)	Per eligibility status	
	Tourist Pass	Unlimited rides for limited duration from date of first use. Rental fee is refundable if returned to the Ticketing Office within rental period; otherwise, may be retained as regular EZ-link card.	Airport Terminals, Ticketing Offices (selected locations)	Per terms of service	
	Standard Ticket^{†}	Single trip fare ticket	Not Available	Phased out since 10 March 2022	

Notes: ^{1}Non-refundable fees may apply to issued cards, surcharges may apply to foreign banking cards ^{2}Refers to usage for public transport for multipurpose cards ^{3}Cash payment was phased out with the exception of TUK-A and staffed ticket counters ^{4}Via credit/debit card only ^{5}Upgrading to SimplyGo must be done at TUK with Supervision. TUK-A and TUK without Supervision is not allowed ^{†}Obsolete

==== Milestones ====
Date	Events
1987	Launched the original magnetic TransitLink farecard
1990	Launched the Integrated Ticketing System (ITS), where magnetic farecard is accepted on all trains and buses.
13 April 2002	Launched FeliCa EZ-Link card as a replacement to the magnetic Transit Link farecard. Both types of cards were accepted concurrently for travel. LTA launched Enhanced Integrated Fare System (EIFS).
1 December 2002	Contactless smart cards fully replaced their magnetic ticket predecessors, making Singapore one of the first cities to implement contactless smart card payment on all main modes of public transportation, similar to Hong Kong.
29 December 2008	Launched CEPAS compliant EZ-link cards.
9 January 2009 - 30 September 2009	Started mass replacement of the FeliCa EZ-link cards with the CEPAS-compliant EZ-link cards. Locally-developed CEPAS specification extends EZ-Link card use to motoring (i.e. car parks and ERP gantries) and retail purposes. NETS, owned by local banks, issues Flashpay cards that also adopt the CEPAS specification. Supported by the first generation of System for e-Payments (SeP) backend system for payment processing/clearing.
1 January 2017 - first half of 2018	Phased out cash top ups at the passenger service centres.
20 March 2017	Started the upgrade of CEPAS to 3.0 and SeP to "System for e-Payment 2.0" to allow the use of credit/debit card in public transport, trials began.
4 April 2019	Allows the use of credit/debit card in public transport.
30 January 2020 - 14 November 2023	Replacement of all transit ticketing machines into Top Up Kiosks for public transport.
28 January 2021	Launched CEPAS 3.0 EZ-Link cards, under SimplyGo Pte Ltd.
23 July 2021 - 9 March 2022	Discontinuation of Single Trip Tickets (Standard Ticket) for the MRT system.
September 2022	Option to upgrade to CEPAS 3.0 offered for undergraduates, polytechnic students, ITE students and full-time National Servicemen.
October 2022	Option to upgrade to CEPAS 3.0 offered for senior citizens, Workfare Transport, adult monthly travel passes and persons with disabilities.
22 November 2022	Launched CEPAS 3.0 NETS Prepaid cards, under SimplyGo Pte Ltd.
9 January 2024	LTA announced phasing out of CEPAS 1.0 and 2.0 legacy EZ-Link and NETS FlashPay cards. The non-ABT system was reaching the end of its operational lifespan, and would be phased out by 1 June 2024.
22 January 2024	LTA's decision to move all to CEPAS 3.0 was later reversed due to public backlash, with the Government spending $40 million to extend the card-based ticketing system until "between 14 October 2025 and 2028". But since July 2026, new EZ-Link cards are only sold via the CEPAS 3.0 platform, which is in line with the 10 October 2028 deadline.
6 September 2024	Option to upgrade to CEPAS 3.0 offered for all School Smartcard holders.

==== Stored-value cards and SimplyGo ====
A non-concessionary stored value travel card from NETS or EZ-Link, may be purchased for S$10 (inclusive of a S$5 non-refundable card cost and a S$5 credit), for the payment of public transportation fares, from ticketing offices or merchant outlets where applicable. The EZ-Link and NETS FlashPay cards may also be used for the payment of goods and services at merchants displaying the "EZ-Link" logo, Electronic Road Pricing (ERP) tolls and Electronic Parking System (EPS) carparks. Commuters can elect to upgrade the legacy EZ-Link cards to SimplyGo, and once done, it is optional to download the EZ-Link or SimplyGo mobile applications to check on the card balance.

On 20 March 2017, LTA started a trial of the usage of contactless debit and credit MasterCard cards for fare payments on all main modes of public transport. Fares are charged directly to their debit or credit cards. From 3 December 2018, the trial was expanded to NETS and Visa cards. On 7 March 2019, the system was renamed to SimplyGo, and it was officially launched on 4 April 2019, starting with MasterCard holders. As of November 2019, Visa and NETS card holders are also able to utilise the system. And finally, all EZ-Link cardholders (including concession) can upgrade to SimplyGo.

On 9 January 2024, LTA announced that NETS FlashPay cards, EZ-Link cards and charms that have not been upgraded to SimplyGo (CEPAS 3.0 or SeP 2.0) can no longer be used for public transport from 1 June 2024. Charms are special EZ-Link cards in the form of trinkets. Only SimplyGo payment options will be accepted at MRT/LRT fare gates and bus card readers, while the aforementioned options may still be used for motoring needs. Due to public backlash, the authorities announced on 22 January 2024 that the decision was reversed and the LTA was tasked to look into improving the user experience for ABT cards and solutions to display the fare and cards balances at fare gates and bus card readers.

In moves to improve standardisation across platforms, the TransitLink and EZ-Link entities will be merged into one company SimplyGo, a wholly owned subsidiary of the Land Transport Authority in August 2024. In addition, the EZ-Link and SimplyGo applications will be integrated into a common application called SimplyGo.

==== Singapore Tourist Pass ====
A Singapore Tourist Pass may be purchased from S$22 (inclusive of a S$10 refundable card deposit and a 3-day pass) for the payment of public transportation fares. The card may be purchased at selected SimplyGo Ticket Offices, LTA Kiosks, Passenger Service Centres and Singapore Visitors Centres, and can be refunded at both SimplyGo Ticket Offices and Passenger Service Centres.

=== Access-control gates ===
Access-control gates found in Singapore's MRT and LRT stations have evolved in design & features over the years. A few different series of gates from different manufacturers have been used in MRT and LRT stations.

The two oldest generations of these gates in the MRT stations began to be removed starting from March 2010 as it is nearing the end of lifespan and prone to vandalism, and this was completed by October 2014 with the exception of Pioneer and Joo Koon, which was completed on 27 June 2017; Expo and Changi Airport were the next and Dover station was completed on 1 October 2017.

The third generation of these gates are also removed from January 2018 and together with the wide faregates under Cubic and Thales. All such of these gates were removed in August 2021 after COVID-19 lockdown for East West and North South lines. The remaining gates were removed from August 2022 in Circle Line and completed in August 2024.

TITAN faregates were removed from August 2024 for SMRT Trains stations. The very last station to get TITAN faregate is Punggol Coast MRT Station.

On 22 July 2018, a hands-free ticketing technology trial was launched at 4 stations to examine the feasibility of a new hands-free fare gate that allows people with disabilities to enter and exit MRT stations without tapping their fare cards. If found to be feasible, the fare gates may be introduced to more stations. The trial lasted until November 2018. A tender for a second trial was announced in February 2020, with the possibility of expanding the system to all public buses and 400 faregates should the trial be successful.

Generation	Manufacturer/type	Location	Image	Features
Former Faregates
1	Cubic AFC gates (First Generation)	North–South Line and East–West Line stations (replaced by 2014, Pioneer and Joo Koon replaced on 27 June 2017)		Magnetic fare card reader (removed by 2003); CEPAS smart card readers Retractable red flaps VFD fare information displays (Some units equipped with angled VFD displays, some of them are in analogue and some of them are in digital); Bulb-operated directional sign displays Red alarm/concession indicator
2	ST Electronics AFC gates	Expo (East–West Line); Bedok; Kembangan; Paya Lebar (East–West Line); Raffles Place; Tanjong Pagar; Outram Park (East–West Line); Dover; Orchard (All phased out beginning with Orchard on 10 June 2011, then Bedok, Kembangan, Paya Lebar and Raffles Place in 2014, others were converted between July and November 2017)		Magnetic fare card reader (removed by 2003); CEPAS smart card readers Retractable red flaps Angled VFD fare information displays LED directional sign displays Red alarm/concession indicator
2	ST Electronics AFC wide faregates	All stations with the exception of Changi Airport, Pioneer and Joo Koon for the North-South and East-West Lines (replaced by January 2020)		Magnetic fare card reader (removed by 2003, exclusively for Expo MRT Station); CEPAS smart card readers Retractable red flaps Angled VFD fare information displays LED directional sign displays Red alarm/concession indicator
1A	Cubic AFC turnstile faregates	Bukit Panjang LRT stations (replaced by November 2017)		Magnetic fare card reader (removed by 2003); CEPAS smart card readers Three arms tripod turnstiles Angled VFD fare information displays Bulb-operated directional sign displays
3	Thales gates	North-East Line, Sengkang LRT, Punggol LRT stations (replaced by January 2019) and Circle Line stations (replaced by August 2024)	A row of Third Generation Gates at Dhoby Ghaut.	CEPAS smart card readers Retractable red flaps (Wide gate feature dual retractable flaps); 6.5" LCD fare information displays LED directional sign displays LED gate status indicators
3	Thales wide faregates	Changi Airport station (replaced by August 2017) and North-East Line, Sengkang LRT, Punggol LRT stations (replaced by January 2019)	A row of Third Generation Gates at Dhoby Ghaut.	Magnetic fare card reader (removed by 2003, only for Changi Airport MRT Station); CEPAS smart card readers Retractable red flaps Angled VFD fare information displays LED directional sign displays Red alarm/concession indicator
Current Faregates
4	Titan automatic gates	North-South Line stations: All North–South Line stations from Jurong East to Raffles Place except Bukit Gombak, Kranji, Toa Payoh & Dhoby Ghaut; East-West Line stations: Raffles Place, Dover, Chinese Garden, Boon Lay, Pioneer, Joo Koon, Gul Circle, Tuas Crescent, Tuas West Road, Tuas Link, Expo and Changi Airport; All North East Line (including Punggol Coast and excluding Dhoby Ghaut & Chinatown stations), Punggol LRT, Sengkang LRT and Bukit Panjang LRT stations Bayfront and Telok Ayer	Orchard MRT concourse level with the faregates.	CEPAS smart card readers Retractable red flaps Angled LCD fare information displays Illuminated LED directional bar LED gate status indicators Frontal LCD (selected units)
4	Titan wide faregates	All North-South Line, East-West Line, North East Line stations (including Punggol Coast), Punggol LRT, Sengkang LRT and Bukit Panjang LRT stations Bayfront and Telok Ayer	Orchard MRT concourse level with the faregates.	CEPAS smart card readers Retractable red flaps Angled LCD fare information displays Illuminated LED directional bar LED gate status indicators Frontal LCD (selected units)
4	Titan Cronos gates	Bukit Panjang LRT stations		CEPAS smart card readers Single bidirectional swing gate Angled top panel fare information display Illuminated LED bar display (indicating lane direction); LED gate status indicators
DTL	Thales swing gates	All Downtown Line stations	Fare gates of the Downtown Line concourse at Bukit Panjang MRT/LRT station	CEPAS smart card readers Bidirectional swing flaps 6.5" LCD fare information displays LED directional sign displays LED gate status indicators
5	Cubic AFC swing gates	East West Line stations: Pasir Ris, Tampines, Simei, Tanah Merah, Bedok, Kembangan, Eunos, Paya Lebar, Aljunied, Kallang, Lavender, Bugis, City Hall, Tanjong Pagar, Outram Park, Tiong Bahru, Redhill, Queenstown, Commonwealth, Clementi, Jurong East, Lakeside, Boon Lay, Pioneer; North South Line stations: Bukit Gombak, Kranji, Toa Payoh, Dhoby Ghaut, Raffles Place, Marina Bay, Marina South Pier; North East Line stations: Chinatown, Clarke Quay, Dhoby Ghaut, Punggol Coast; Circle Line stations: All stations including Keppel, Cantonment and Prince Edward Road; Downtown Line stations: Hume, Tampines West, Xilin, Sungei Bedok; Thomson-East Coast Line stations: All Thomson–East Coast line stations		CEPAS smart card readers Two bidirectional glass swing flaps LCD fare information display LED directional sign display LED gate status indicators
5	Cubic AFC wide faregates			CEPAS smart card readers Two bidirectional glass swing flaps LCD fare information display LED directional sign display LED gate status indicators

=== Passenger service centres ===
Passenger service centres are control stations that looks after the station, and handle cash top-ups for all MRT cards. By the first half of 2018, cash top-ups at all passenger service centres were phased out.

=== Ticketing machines ===
Machine	Location	Accepted Mode of Payment	Features
General Ticketing Machine (GTM)	Circle Line; Downtown Line; East–West Line; North East Line; North–South Line; Thomson–East Coast Line; Bukit Panjang LRT; Sengkang LRT; Punggol LRT	Cash (Minimum S$2 as banknote); NETS; Credit/Debit Card	Topping up CEPAS cards Upgrading CEPAS cards to SimplyGo; Checking last 30 travel transactions Encoding and extension of monthly concession passes with NETS; Manage Auto Reload services through GIRO or Credit/Debit Card; For those using cash, no change is given in the machine. Cash can only be used with $2, $5, $10 and $50 banknotes. GTMs by Cubic were introduced for North–South, East–West and Circle lines, whereas GTMs by Ascom were introduced for North East Line.
Add Value Machine (AVM) (2002 - 2013) and Add Value Machine (AVM+) (2013 - 2022)	North–South Line and East–West Line (All replaced by November 2021); Bus Interchanges	NETS	Topping up CEPAS cards Upgrading CEPAS cards to SimplyGo; Checking last 30 travel transactions Encoding and extension of monthly concession passes Manage Auto Reload services through GIRO or Credit/Debit Card; Payment of penalty fee Express claims and filing for refunds Emailing of travel transactions Instant redemption of travel voucher and rewards Originally accepts magnetic farecards and was upgraded to stored value cards in 2002.
Top-Up Machine (TUM)	Circle Line (All replaced by March 2021); Downtown Line; North–South Line; East–West Line; Punggol LRT; Sengkang LRT; Bukit Panjang LRT	NETS	Topping up CEPAS cards Upgrading CEPAS cards to SimplyGo; Checking last 30 travel transactions
Top-Up Kiosk (TUK)	Circle Line; Downtown Line; East–West Line; North East Line; North–South Line; Thomson–East Coast Line; Bukit Panjang LRT; Sengkang LRT; Punggol LRT	NETS; Credit/Debit Card	Topping up CEPAS cards Upgrading CEPAS cards to SimplyGo; Checking last 30 travel transactions Encoding and extension of monthly concession passes Manage Auto Reload services through GIRO or Credit/Debit Card; Payment of penalty fee Express claims and filing for refunds Emailing of travel transactions
Top-Up Kiosk with Cash Accepted (TUK-A)	Circle Line; Downtown Line; East–West Line; North East Line; North–South Line; Thomson–East Coast Line; Bukit Panjang LRT; Sengkang LRT; Punggol LRT	Cash (Minimum S$2 as banknote); NETS; Credit/Debit Card	Topping up CEPAS cards Upgrading CEPAS cards to SimplyGo; Checking last 30 travel transactions Encoding and extension of monthly concession passes Manage Auto Reload services through GIRO or Credit/Debit Card; Payment of penalty fee Express claims and filing for refunds Emailing of travel transactions For those using cash, no change is given in the machine. Cash can only be used with $2, $5, $10 and $50 banknotes.
Assisted Service Kiosk (ASK)	Thomson–East Coast Line	NETS; Credit/Debit Card	Topping up CEPAS cards Upgrading CEPAS cards to SimplyGo; Checking last 30 travel transactions Encoding and extension of monthly concession passes Manage Auto Reload services through GIRO or Credit/Debit Card; Payment of penalty fee Express claims and filing for refunds Emailing of travel transactions

==== Replacement of all ticketing machines into Top-Up Kiosk (TUK) ====
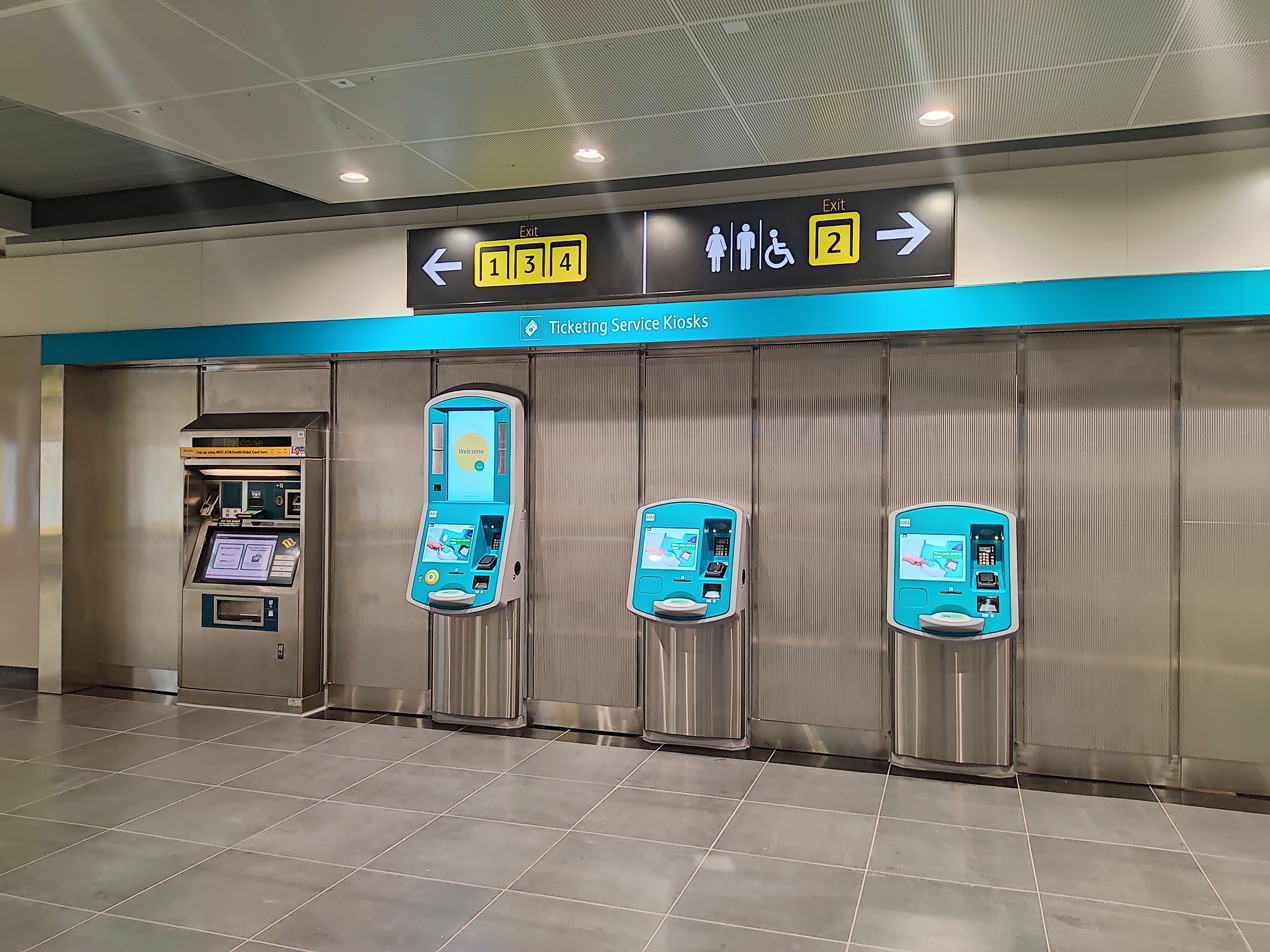
General Ticketing Machines (GTMs) (Phased out), Assisted Service Kiosks (ASKs) and Top-Up Kiosks (TUK) in the MRT station

During the COVID-19 pandemic, Add Value Machine (AVM), Top-Up Machine (TUM) and General Ticketing Machines (GTMs) were however replaced by Top-Up Kiosk (TUK). These replacement programme are as follows:

- 23 January 2020 - 15 January 2021: Circle Line and Thomson–East Coast Line
- 19 April 2021 - 19 July 2021: North–South Line
- 23 July 2021 - 15 November 2021: East–West Line
- 23 November 2021 - 19 February 2022: Downtown Line
- 1 March 2022 - 15 May 2022: North East Line

Subsequently; all stations were upgraded to Top-Up Kiosk with Cash Accepted (TUK-A) where cash can be accepted. Top Up Kiosks (TUK) can only accept NETS and Credit/Debit Card only together with the Assisted Service Kiosk (ASK). The Top Up Kiosk with Cash Accepted (TUK-A) with Top Up Kiosk (TUK) arrangement is made permanent since 2020, even after the full implementation of Account Based Ticketing (ABT - CEPAS 3.0). This is so that commuters who are unable to top up using cashless means, can still do so at the TUK-A machine where ticket offices are during certain hours and places only.

Upgrading to SimplyGo is only allowed under Top-Up Kiosk with Supervision. Top-Up Kiosks without Supervision and Top-Up Kiosk with Cash Accepted (TUK-A) do not allow upgrading to SimplyGo.

== See also ==
- Mass Rapid Transit (Singapore)
