= International rankings of Singapore =

National rating on multiple scales

The following are some international rankings for Singapore.

== Communications ==
- Singapore is ranked 1st globally for average fixed broadband download speed (Oookla, July, 2025).
- Singapore ranked 5th out of 139 economies in the 2026 Global Innovation Index

== Demographics ==
- CIA World Factbook: Total fertility rate 2025 estimate, ranked 192 out of 237 countries (0.87)
- Population density ranked 3 out of 242 countries
- United Nations: Population ranked 114 out of 233 countries
- United Nations: World Population Policies 2005 number of immigrants, ranked 22 out of 192 countries
- International Organization for Migration: 7th most cosmopolitan nation.

== Economy ==
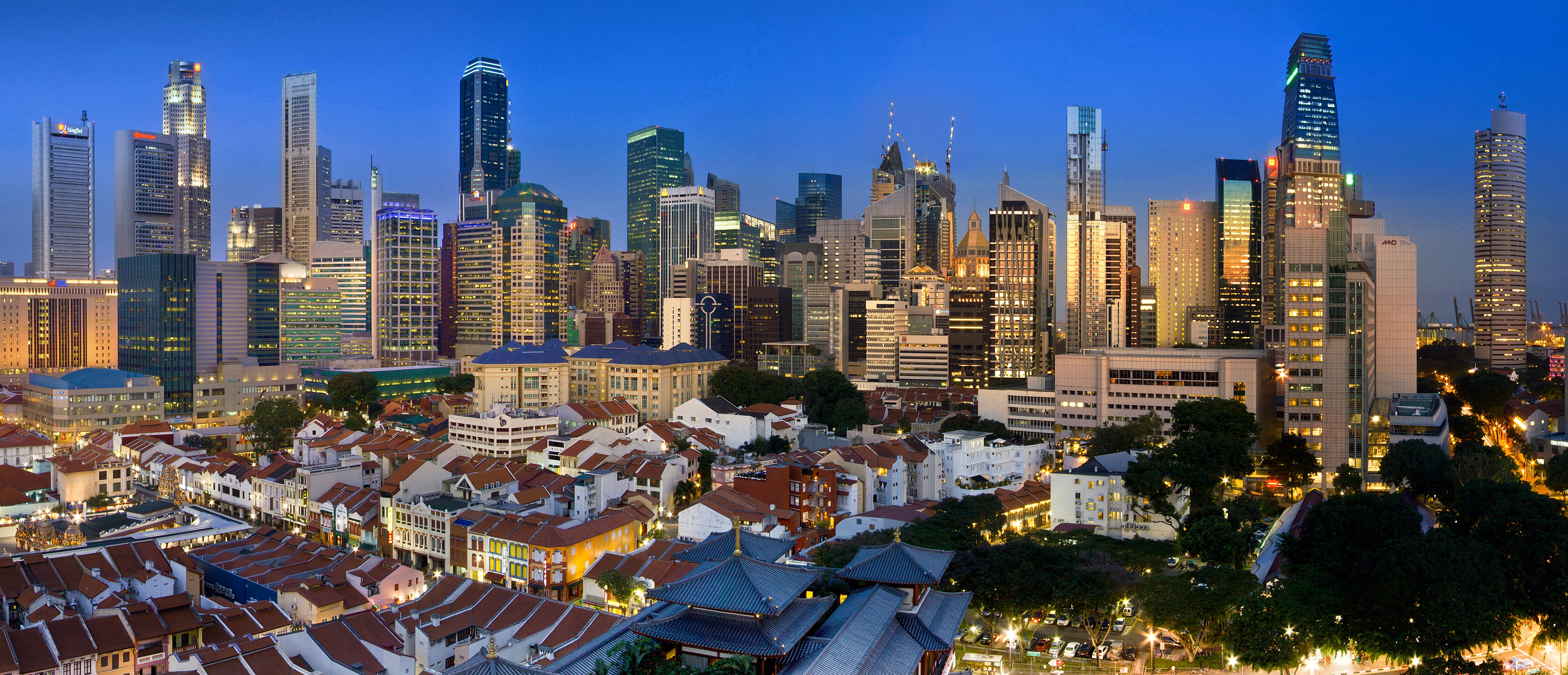
The Central Area, photographed on 22 May 2009

- Singapore is ranked first worldwide for the ease of doing business by the World Bank for 2012, consecutively for 7 years.
- Singapore is ranked the #1 most competitive country in the world.
- Singapore is the 14th most expensive city in the world to spend a night in.
- The Economist: Where-to-be-born Index 2013, ranked 6 out of 111 countries
- As of March 2024, Singapore's external debt ranked 16 out of 202 countries.
- Foreign exchange reserves ranked 10 out of 121 countries
- Nominal GDP —
  - IMF: ranked 36 out of 188 countries (2014)
  - World Bank: ranked 36 out of 189 countries (2014)
- Nominal GDP growth rate 2014 estimate: ranked 99 out of 198 countries
- Nominal GDP per capita —
  - IMF: ranked 6 out of 186 countries (2015)
- GDP (PPP) per capita —
  - IMF: ranked 2 out of 186 countries (2025)
  - World Bank: ranked 3 out of 185 countries (2014)
- United Nations: Human Development Index 2024, ranked 9 out of 193 countries
- The Heritage Foundation/The Wall Street Journal: Index of Economic Freedom 2021, Index of Economic Freedom 1st out of 178 countries
- World Economic Forum: Travel and Tourism Competitiveness Index 2013, ranked 10 out of 140 countries
- World Tourism Organization: World Tourism rankings, ranked 29 out of all countries
- Singapore has claimed the top position in the 2025 Global Talent Competitiveness Index (GTCI) for the first time, bolstered by its robust education systems, sound governance and a proactive approach to sustaining an adaptive, innovation-ready workforce in the age of artificial intelligence.

== Education ==
- Ranked 1 in the 2015 OECD global education report

== Energy ==
- CIA World Factbook: refined petroleum consumption 2015, ranked 18 out of 215 countries
- CIA World Factbook: oil consumption 2012, ranked 78 out of 211 countries

== Environment ==
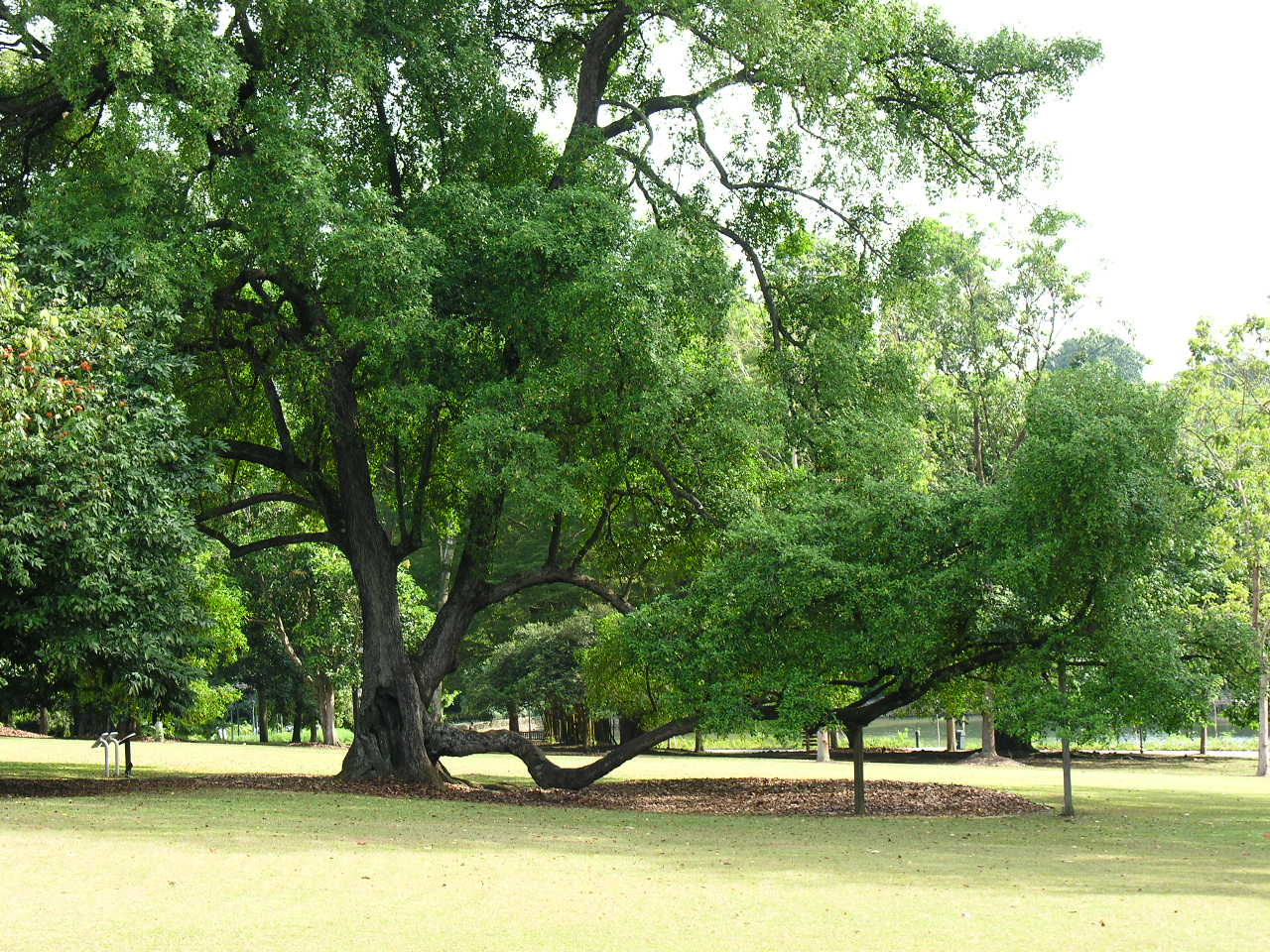
A tembusu tree (Fagraea fragrans) at the Singapore Botanic Gardens

- CIA World Factbook: water resources (2011 figures), ranked 160 out of 172 countries
- New Economics Foundation: Happy Planet Index 2012, ranked 90 out of 151 countries
- US Department of Energy: CO_{2} emissions per capita 2008, ranked 58 out of 214 countries
- Save The Children: End of Childhood report 2018, ranked 1 out of 175 countries

== Geography ==
- CIA World Factbook: Total area ranked 190 out of 249 countries and oceans

== Labour ==
- Singapore is ranked 47 out of 148 countries on the World Economic Forum Global Gender Gap Report.

== Military ==
- List of countries by Global Militarization Index: ranked 8 out of 149 countries

== Politics and law ==
- In 2022, Singapore was ranked 17th in the world in the Rule of Law Index by the World Justice Project.
- The Economist: Democracy Index 2018, ranked 66 out of 167 countries
- Reporters Without Borders: Worldwide Press Freedom Index 2017: ranked 151 out of 180 countries

== Technology ==
- UN e-Government Readiness Index, Singapore ranks 3rd.
- Singapore ranked 2nd out of 144 countries in the Global Information Technology Report 2014 by the World Economic Forum.
- Networked Readiness Index, Singapore ranks 1st out of 139 countries.
- World Intellectual Property Organization: Global Innovation Index 2026, ranked 5 out of 139 countries

== Transportation ==
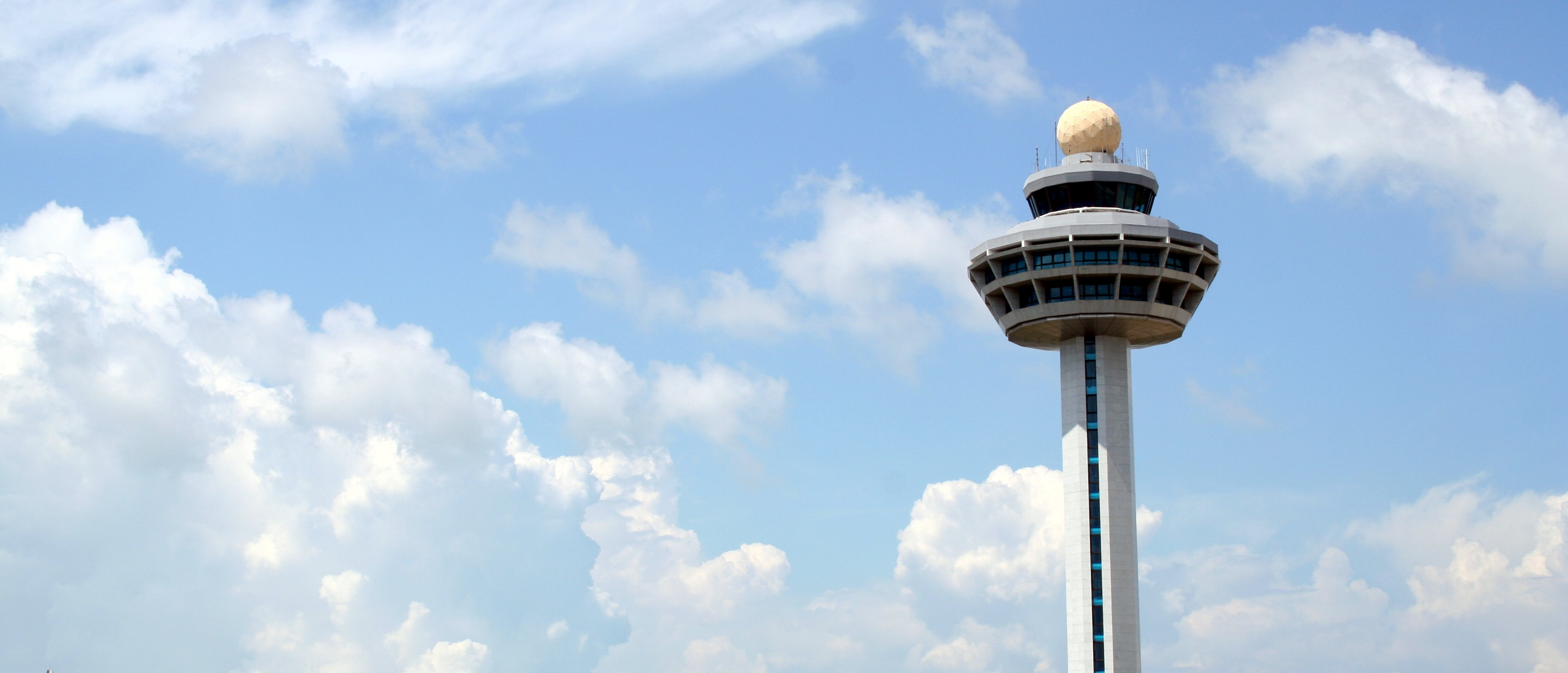
The air traffic control tower of Singapore Changi Airport

== Others ==
- Singapore is ranked third among Asian countries in 2014 on Gallup's Potential Net Migration Index.
- Most expensive cities —
  - Economist Intelligence Unit: Cost of Living Survey 2014, ranked 1 out of 140 cities in the world
  - Mercer: Worldwide Cost of Living Survey 2014, ranked 4 out of 211 cities

== See also ==
- List of international rankings
- Lists of countries
- Lists by country
