= List of islands of Singapore =

This is a list of islands of Singapore. Massive land reclamation works over the past centuries has merged many of Singapore's former islands and islets and has created a few larger ones. In the 1960s, prior to land reclamation projects, it was estimated that Singapore had about 77 islands and islets. At present, Singapore has about 64 islands, with 7 of them belonging to the Singapore Armed Forces (SAF).

However, some recent academic and cartographic studies report lower totals ranging from approximately 44 to 54 islands, depending on whether reclaimed land, amalgamated islands, and small islets are counted separately.

== List of islands ==
The following is a list of islands based on a source published by Singapore's National Library Board.

=== For civilian use ===
Islands of Singapore

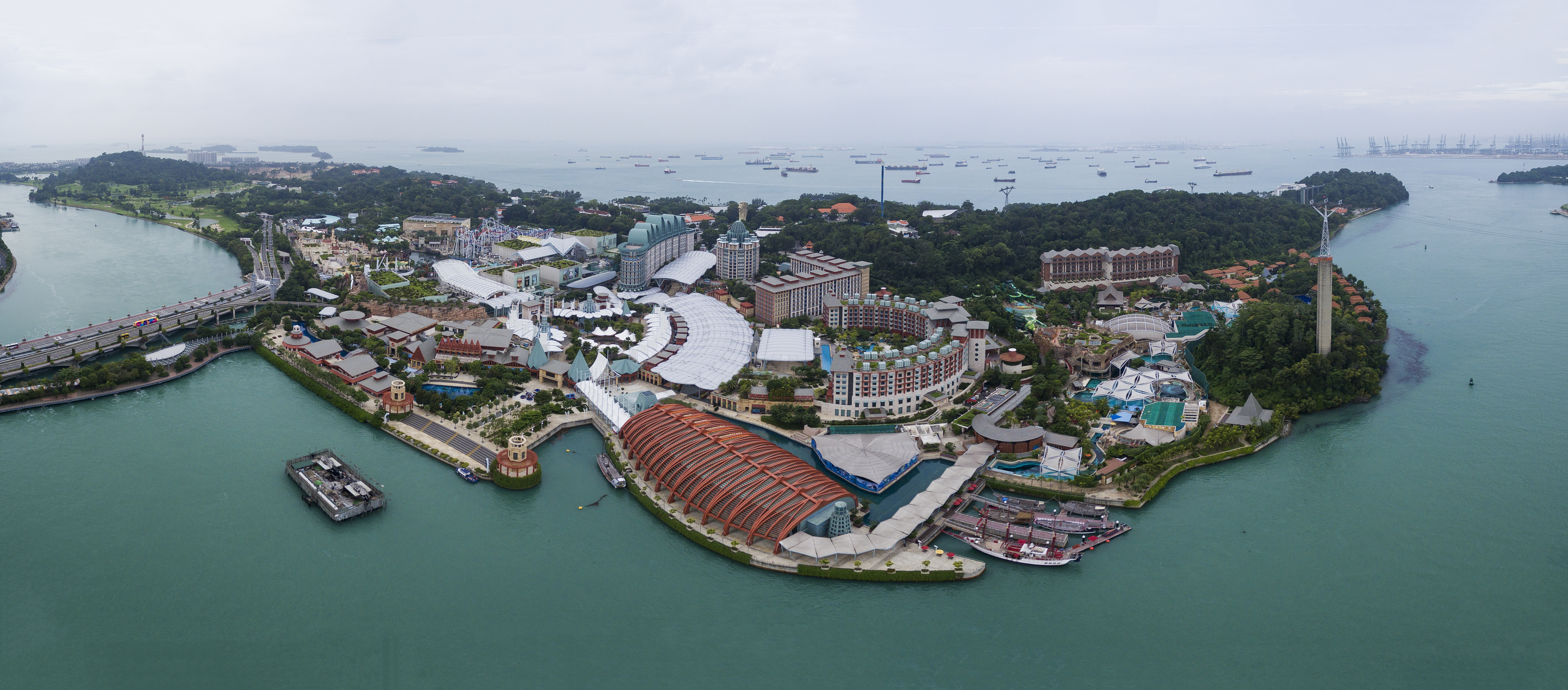
Sentosa

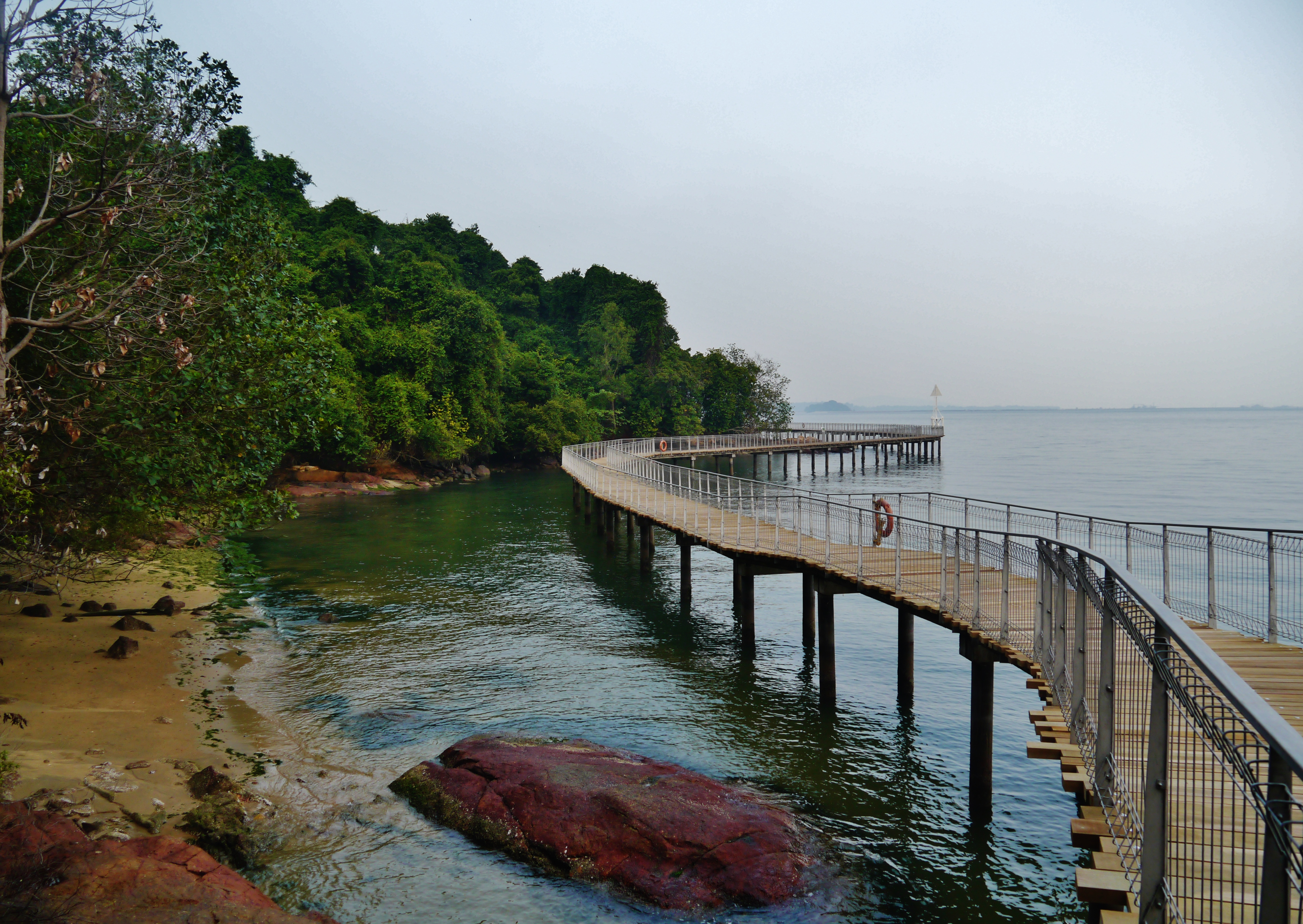
Ubin

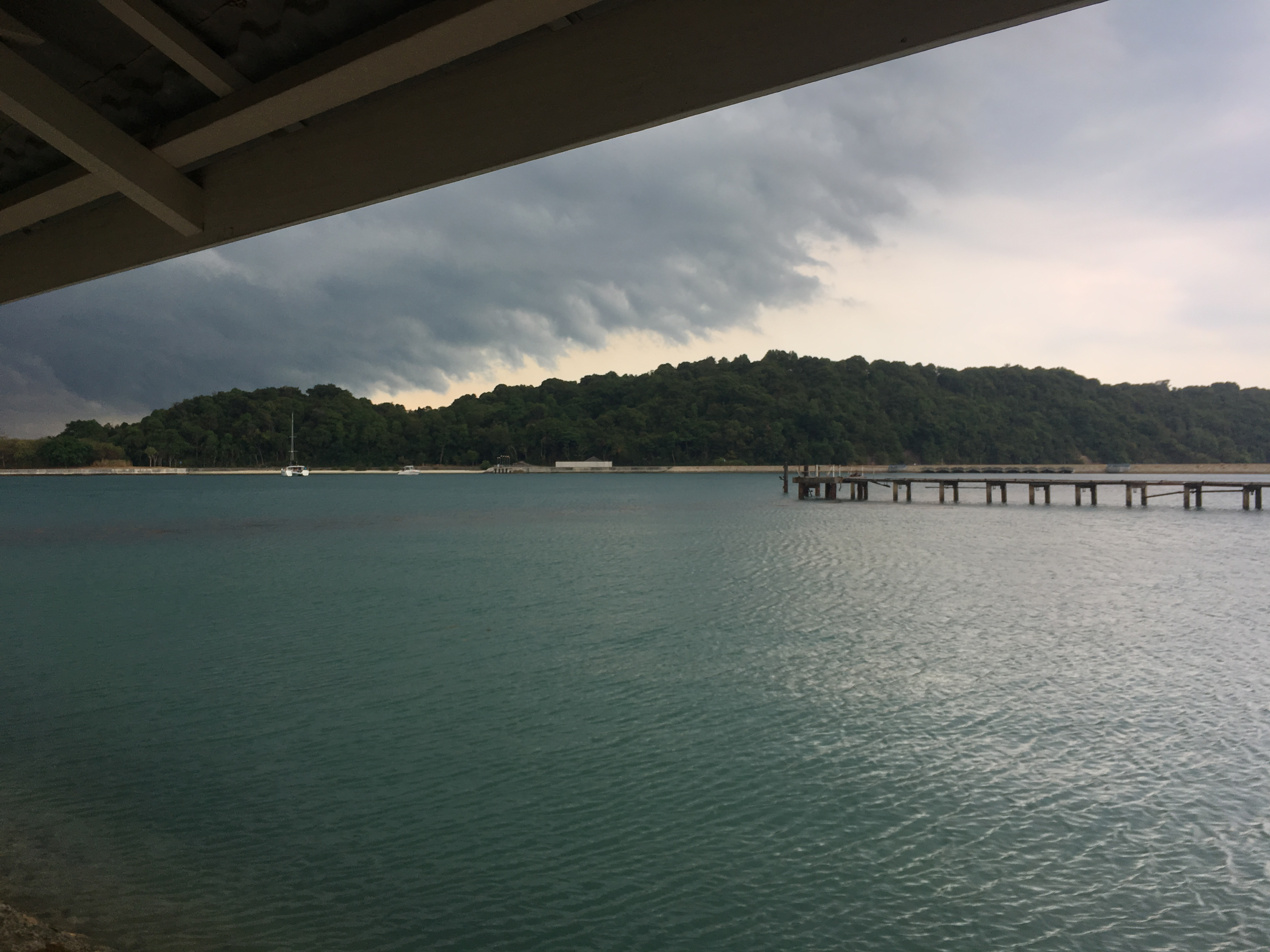
Saint John's

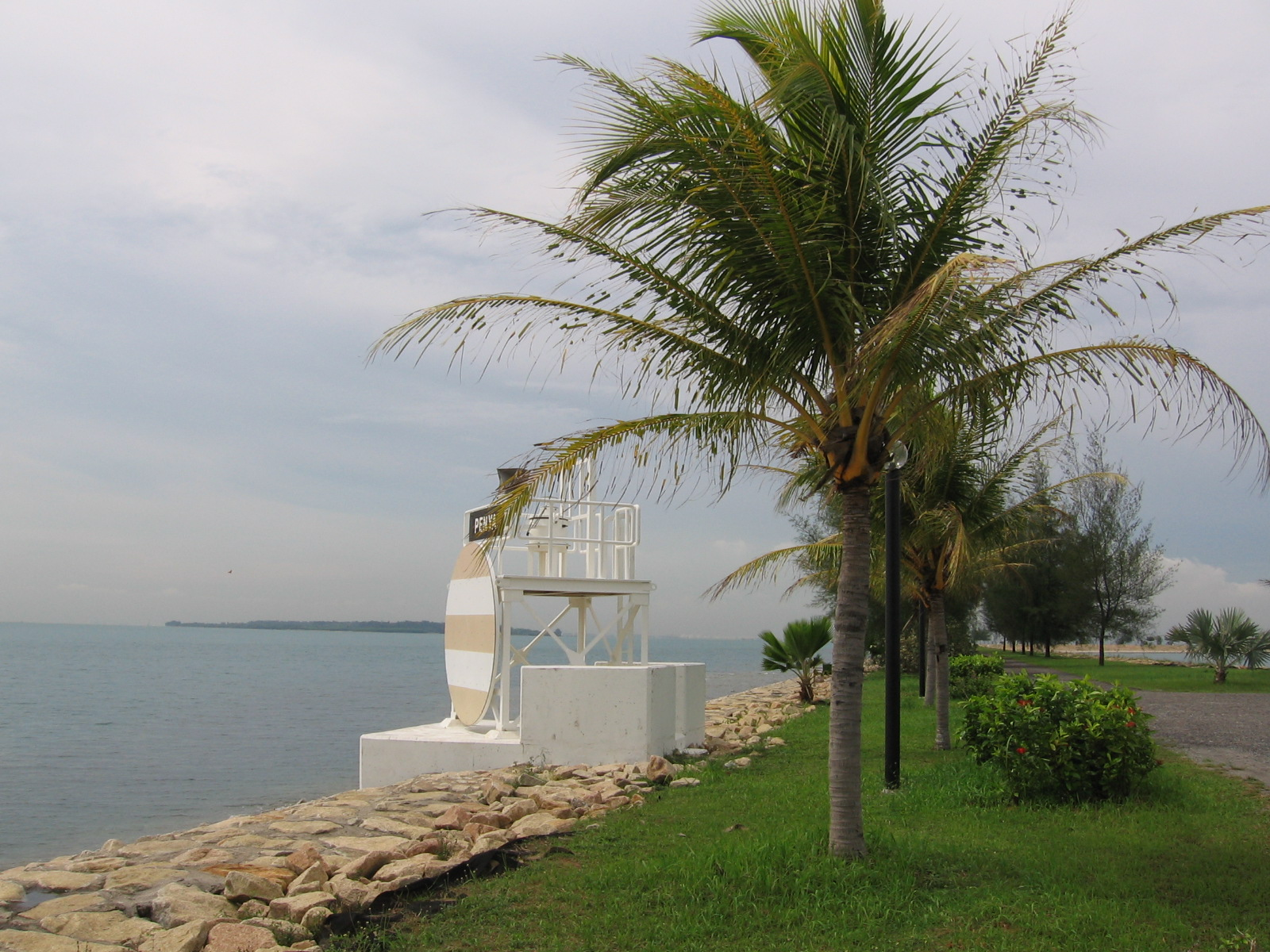
Semakau

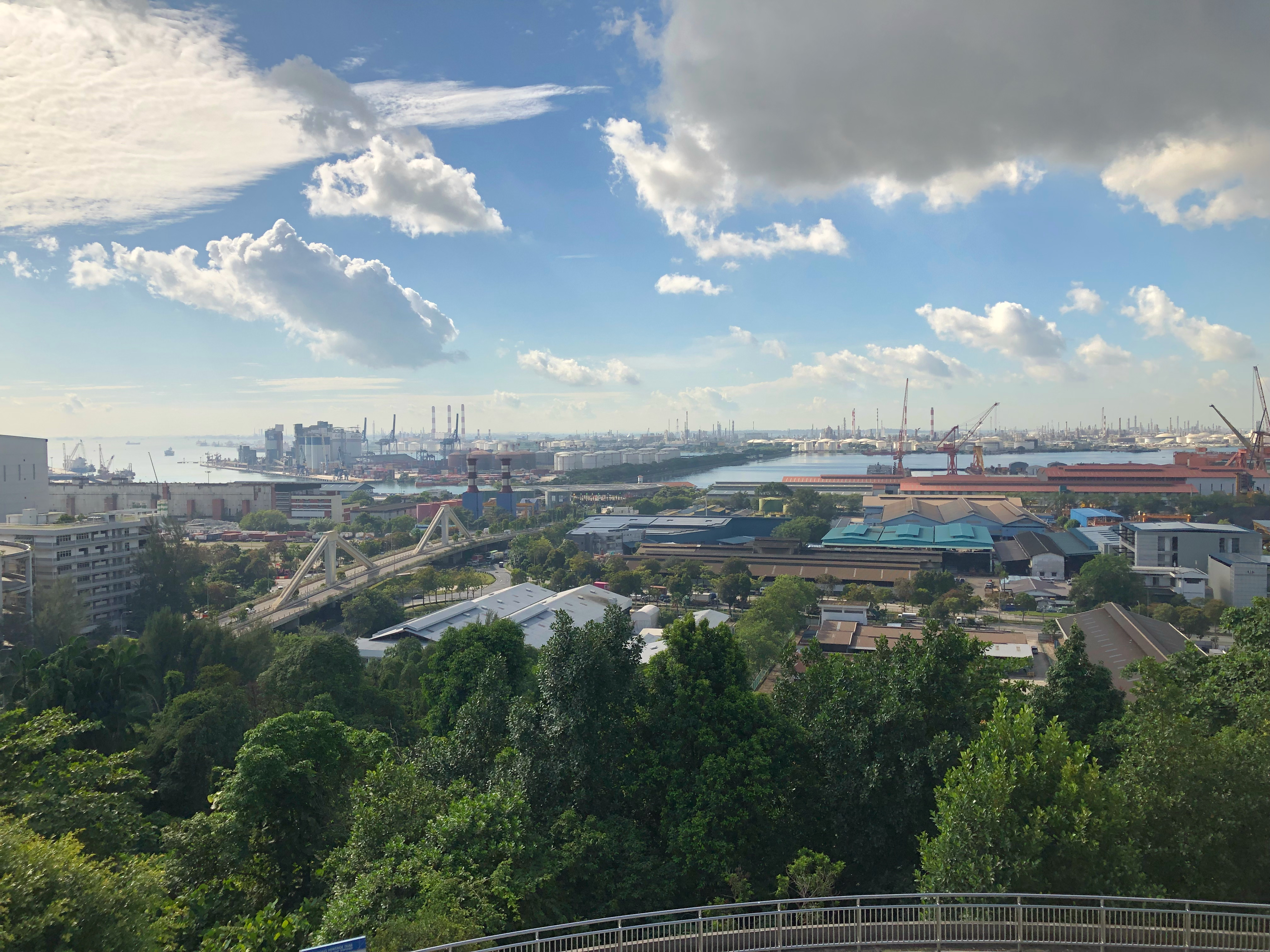
Jurong

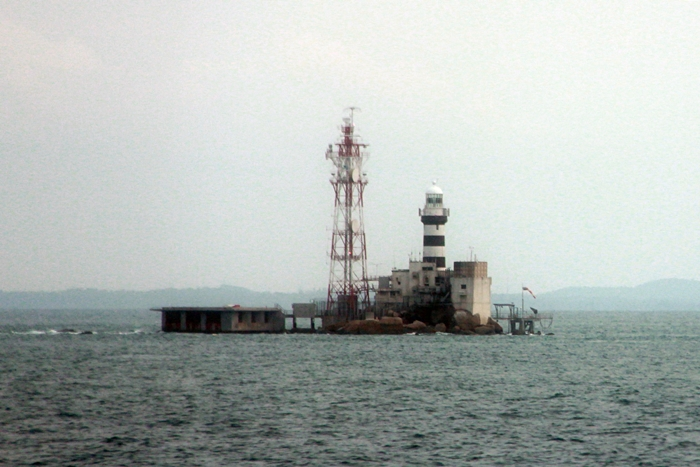
Pedra Branca

Island	Planning Area	Region	Area (km^{2})	Area (sq mi)
Pulau Ujong (Singapore Island)	—N/a		710	270
Pulau Ubin	North-Eastern Islands	North-East Region	10.19	3.93
Pulau Blakang Mati (Sentosa)	Southern Islands	Central Region	4.71	1.82
Pulau Bukom Kechil	Western Islands	West Region	2.1	0.81
Pulau Bukom	Western Islands	West Region	1.45	0.56
Pulau Serangoon (Coney Island)	Punggol	North-East Region	1.33	0.51
Pulau Buloh	Lim Chu Kang	North Region	1.3	0.50
Pulau Brani	Bukit Merah	Central Region	1.22	0.47
Pulau Sebarok	Western Islands	West Region	0.468	0.181
Pulau Sakijang Pelepah (Lazarus Island)	Southern Islands	Central Region	0.47	0.18
Pulau Sakijang Bendera (Saint John's Island)	Southern Islands	Central Region	0.405	0.156
Pulau Seletar	Simpang	North Region	0.385	0.149
Pulau Berkas	Western Islands	West Region	0.26	0.10
Pulau Hantu	Western Islands	West Region	0.126	0.049
Pulau Kusu	Southern Islands	Central Region	0.085	0.033
Pulau Keppel	Bukit Merah	Central Region	0.053	0.020
Pulau Subar Laut (Big Sister's Island)	Southern Islands	Central Region	0.039	0.015
Pulau Subar Darat (Little Sister's Island)	Southern Islands	Central Region	0.017	0.0066
Pulau Satumu	Western Islands	West Region	0.013	0.0050
Pulau Palawan	Southern Islands	Central Region	0.004	0.0015
Pulau Biola	Southern Islands	Central Region	0.004	0.0015
Pulau Samulun	Western Islands	West Region	0.004	0.0015
Pulau Jong	Western Islands	West Region	0.006	0.0023
Pulau Salu	Western Islands	West Region	0.0075	0.0029
Pulau Anak Bukom	Western Islands	West Region	0.002	0.00077
Pedra Branca	Changi Bay	East Region	0.00856	0.00331
Sultan Shoal	Tuas	West Region	0.006	0.0023
Pulau Damar Laut	Jurong East	West Region	—N/a	—N/a
Pulau Damien	North-Eastern Islands	North-East Region	—N/a	—N/a
Pulau Ketam	North-Eastern Islands	North-East Region	—N/a	—N/a
Pulau Khatib Bongsu	Simpang	North Region	—N/a	—N/a
Pulau Malang Siajar	North-Eastern Islands	North-East Region	—N/a	—N/a
Pulau Seringat	Southern Islands	Central Region	—N/a	—N/a
Pulau Seringat Kechil	Southern Islands	Central Region	—N/a	—N/a
Pulau Tekukor	Southern Islands	Central Region	—N/a	—N/a
Pulau Ular	Southern Islands	Central Region	—N/a	—N/a
Batu Belalai	North-Eastern Islands	North-East Region	—N/a	—N/a
Pulau Renggis	Southern Islands	Central Region	—N/a	—N/a

=== For military use ===
Island	Planning Area	Region	Area (km^{2})	Area (sq mi)
Pulau Tekong	North-Eastern Islands	North-East Region	40	15
Pulau Sudong	Western Islands	West Region	2.09	0.81
Pulau Senang	Western Islands	West Region	0.817	0.315
Pulau Pawai	Western Islands	West Region	0.182	0.070
Pulau Sarimbun	Western Water Catchment	West Region	0.014	0.0054
Pulau Bajau	Western Water Catchment	West Region	—N/a	—N/a
Pulau Pergam	Western Water Catchment	West Region	—N/a	—N/a
Pulau Unum	North-Eastern Islands	North-East Region	—N/a	—N/a

=== Artificial islands ===
Island	Planning Area	Region	Area (km^{2})	Area (sq mi)
Jurong Island	Western Islands	West Region	32	12
Pulau Semakau	Western Islands	West Region	3.5	1.4
Pulau Punggol Barat	Seletar	North-East Region	1.92	0.74
Pulau Punggol Timor	Seletar	North-East Region	1.12	0.43
Pearl Island	Southern Islands	Central Region	0.019	0.0073
Coral Island	Southern Islands	Central Region	0.017	0.0066
Sandy Island	Southern Islands	Central Region	0.0007	0.00027
Treasure Island	Southern Islands	Central Region	—N/a	—N/a
Paradise Island	Southern Islands	Central Region	—N/a	—N/a
Chinese Garden	Jurong East	West Region	—N/a	—N/a
Japanese Garden	Jurong East	West Region	—N/a	—N/a
Siloso West Island	Southern Islands	Central Region	—N/a	—N/a
Siloso Beach Island	Southern Islands	Central Region	—N/a	—N/a
Palawan Beach Island	Southern Islands	Central Region	—N/a	—N/a
Nibong Island	Marina South	Central Region	—N/a	—N/a
Dragonfly Island	Marina South	Central Region	—N/a	—N/a

=== Former islands ===
Island	Planning Area	Remarks
Anak Pulau	Western Islands	Merged to form part of Jurong Island
Christmas Island	—N/a	Sovereignty transferred to Australia in 1955
Cocos (Keeling) Islands	—N/a	Sovereignty transferred to Australia in 1955
Pulau Ayer Chawan	Western Islands	Merged to form part of Jurong Island
Pulau Ayer Merbau	Western Islands	Merged to form part of Jurong Island
Pulau Bakau	Western Islands	Merged to form part of Jurong Island
Pulau Buaya	Western Islands	Merged to form part of Jurong Island
Pulau Chichir	Jurong East	Merged to form part of Jurong Port
Pulau Gelang	Kallang	Merged to form part of Kallang Airport
Pulau Kuching	Boon Lay	Merged to form part of Jurong Industrial Estate
Pulau Merawang	Tuas	Merged to form part of Tuas
Pulau Merlimau	Western Islands	Merged to form part of Jurong Island
Pulau Mesemut Darat	Western Islands	Merged to form part of Jurong Island
Pulau Mesemut Laut	Western Islands	Merged to form part of Jurong Island
Pulau Meskol	Western Islands	Merged to form part of Jurong Island
Pulau Pesek	Western Islands	Merged to form part of Jurong Island
Pulau Pesek Kechil	Western Islands	Merged to form part of Jurong Island
Pulau Saigon	Singapore River	Merged to the southern bank of Singapore River
Pulau Sakra	Western Islands	Merged to form part of Jurong Island
Pulau Seking	Western Islands	Merged to form part of Pulau Semakau
Pulau Selugu	Southern Islands	Merged to form part of Sentosa
Pulau Seraya	Western Islands	Merged to form part of Jurong Island
Pulau Tekong Kechil	North-Eastern Islands	Merged to form part of Pulau Tekong
Terumbu Retan Laut	Queenstown	Merged to form part of Pasir Panjang Container Terminal
