= Pulau Sudong Airport =

- IATA: none; ICAO: none

Summary
- Airport type: Military
- Owner: Government of Singapore
- Operator: MINDEF
- Serves: Singapore
- Location: Pulau Sudong
- Coordinates: 1°12′20″N 103°43′09″E
- Interactive map of Pulau Sudong Airport

Runways
Direction	Length		Surface
Direction	m	ft	Surface
09/27	2,440	7,999	Asphalt

Pulau Sudong Airport is a military airstrip used by the Republic of Singapore Air Force (RSAF) on Sudong Island. It has a singular asphalt runway of 7,999 feet (2,438 m) in length and is located 7 metres (23 ft) above mean sea level (MSL). It is maintained by the RSAF year-round by a crew of workers that visit the island regularly.

== History ==
Pulau Sudong was originally a smaller island with a civilian population. It was later reclaimed and gazetted for military use, with its residents relocated to mainland Singapore during the 1970s. In 1989, the Singapore Armed Forces (SAF) officially designated the island as one of its live-firing areas, and in 1994, a runway was constructed by a company called L&M to support military operations.

=== Runway extension ===
In 2024, the government announced plans to extend and upgrade the runway on Pulau Sudong to enhance safety for military aircraft, particularly during emergencies and bad weather conditions. To reduce the environmental impact of the project, rare and vulnerable species will be relocated and habitat restoration efforts will be undertaken after the reclamation is completed by 2028.

The Southern Islands, Singapore. Panoramic view of Pulau Satumu (Raffles Lighthouse), Pulau Biola, Pulau Senang, Pulau Pawai and Pulau Sudong, from Pulau Semakau. Pulau Sudong is the island furthest to the right.)

== See also ==
- List of airports in Singapore
- Western Islands
