= RSAF Black Knights =

- Insignia of the RSAF Black Knights
- Founded: 1973; 53 years ago
- Disbanded: 2015
- Country: Singapore
- Branch: Republic of Singapore Air Force
- Role: Aerobatics
- Size: 6-8 aircraft
- Garrison/HQ: Tengah Air Base
- Colours: Red; White

Commanders
- Current commander: LTC Joseph Leong

Aircraft flown
- Fighter: F-16C

The Black Knights is the official aerobatics team of the Republic of Singapore Air Force (RSAF) featuring six F-16C Fighting Falcons in formation flight. The Black Knights' emblem is sported on the red vertical tail of each of the team's aircraft and the team's name is emblazoned on both sides of the aircraft which are painted in red and white—the national colours of Singapore.

== History ==
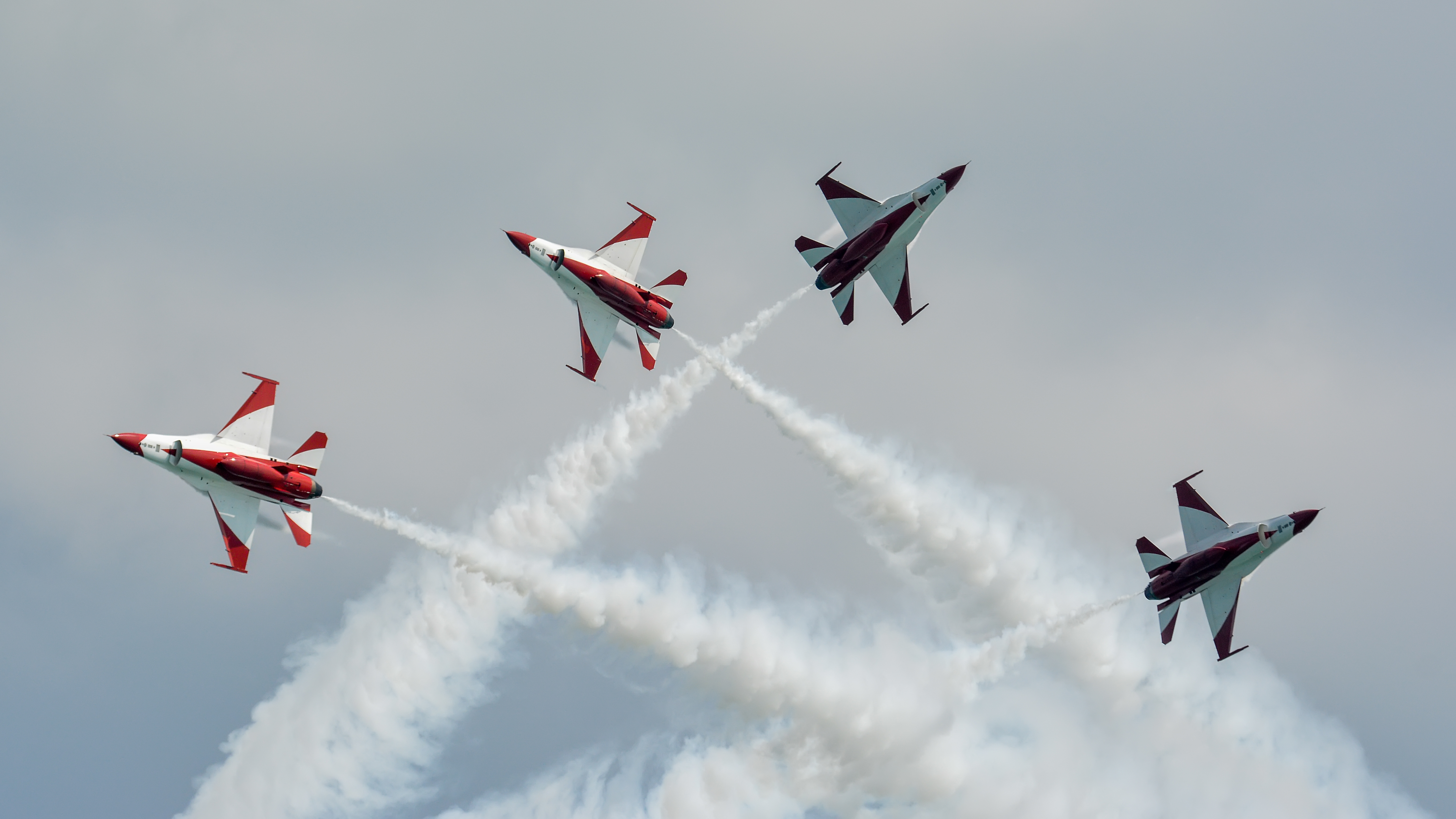
Black Knights perform crossing maneuver

The team was commissioned in 1973 initially as the Osprey Red, five years after the creation of the RSAF and eight years as an independent nation. In 1974, the team was renamed as the Black Knights.

The Black Knights has its namesake of origin from the game of chess where the Knight is widely regarded as the most aggressive, flexible and manoeuvrable of all the chess pieces, having both the ability to breach barriers and move in nimble and strategically important directions, thus exemplifying flexibility and precision manoeuvrability as personified by the pilots of the team during their aerial manoeuvres.

The Black Knights is also the formation insignia of Tengah Air Base, home to the RSAF's fighter aircraft and the RSAF Black Knights.

In 1979, four members of the squadron were killed when their aircraft crashed into a cloud-covered mountain in Quezon province, Philippines. One of the people who survived the accident due to mechanical problems grounding his aircraft was Tsu Way Ming, who would later pilot SilkAir Flight 185 that crashed in Palembang, Indonesia in December 1997.

In tandem with the technological advancements and development of the RSAF, the Black Knights progressed from flying a four-ship formation of the Hawker Hunter F.74Ss in the 1970s to a five-ship F-5E Tiger IIs team in the 1980s.

In the 1990s, the Black Knights performed in a six-aircraft formation consisting of the locally re-engined A-4SU Super Skyhawks, using it until year 2000 (refer to performances).

Because the RSAF does not have a dedicated aerobatics squadron, this team consists of F-16C Block 52 and pilots from various F-16 squadrons.

In 2015, following the SG50 celebrations, the Black Knights were temporarily disbanded as it was not cost effective to permanently take out 8 F-16 Block 52 for aerobatic use only. As of 2025, there are no plans to reactivate the Black Knights yet.

== Training ==
Also, other than full dress rehearsal for National Day Parade or air shows and partly due to the limited airspace available for training in Singapore since its inception back in the 1970s, the Black Knights has frequently conducted their own training over the airspace within Singapore Armed Forces Southern Islands Live-firing zone, which encompasses the offshore islands of Pulau Sudong, Pulau Senang and Pulau Pawai.

== Performances ==
=== Asian Aerospace 2000 ===
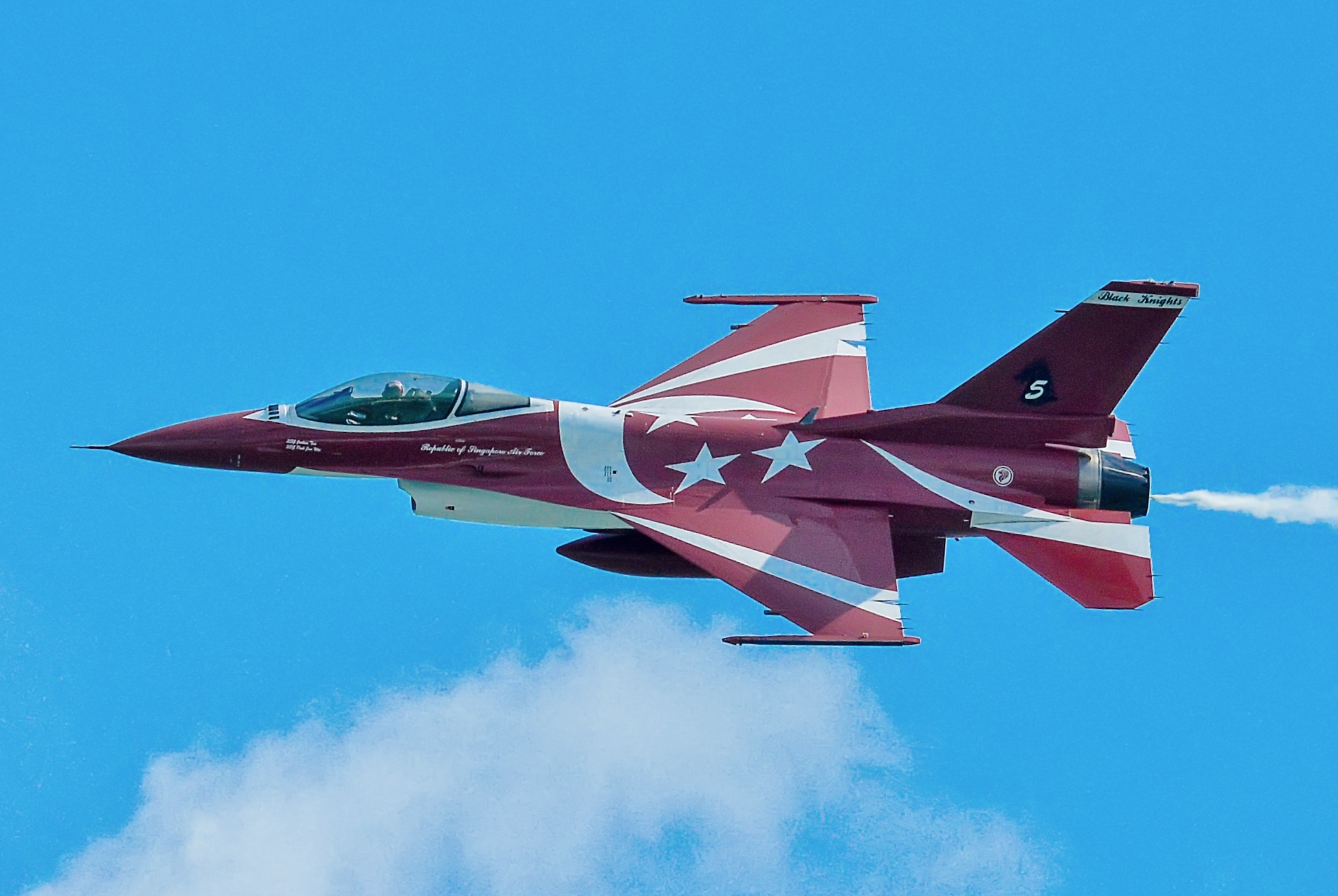
Closeup of a RSAF Black Knight F-16 performing.

Asian Aerospace 2000 was one of the first major air shows of the new millennium, this inspired plans for another six-aircraft RSAF Black Knights aerobatics team. As it was envisioned that the team would fly an all-F-16 display, four A-4SUs were added to bring the team to six when only two F-16s were available. This decision turn out to make history for the RSAF as it became the first air force in the world to combine these two aircraft types in one aerobatics team and was thus flown as such during the air show (see Fig. 1 & 2 in photo gallery).

=== National Day Parade 2000 (NDP2000) ===
On 9 August 2000, the RSAF Black Knights appeared during the air segment of the parade which featured a four-ship formation flight of A-4SU Super Skyhawks performing aerobatic stunts to thrill the crowds at the Padang in front of Singapore's City Hall building. This marks the last time the team uses A-4SU Super Skyhawks, the type was finally retired from front-line use in 2005.

=== Singapore Airshow 2008 ===
After a hiatus of almost eight years, the newly reformed RSAF Black Knights took their F-16Cs to perform aerobatic flying displays at the inaugural Singapore Airshow from 19 to 24 February 2008.

=== Overseas performances ===
On 24 April 2008, at the invitation of Air Chief Marshal Chalit Pukbhasuk – Commander-in-Chief of Royal Thai Air Force (RTAF), the Black Knights performed in an aerial display at the Don Muang Airport, Bangkok. This performance by the RSAF Black Knights was to commemorate the 25th anniversary of RSAF-RTAF bilateral exercises which had begun in 1983.

=== National Day Parade 2008 (NDP2008) ===
As with the tradition of National Day Parades in Singapore held every year since 1966, the Republic of Singapore Air Force scheduled the Black Knights for another crowd thrilling appearance during National Day Parade, 2008.

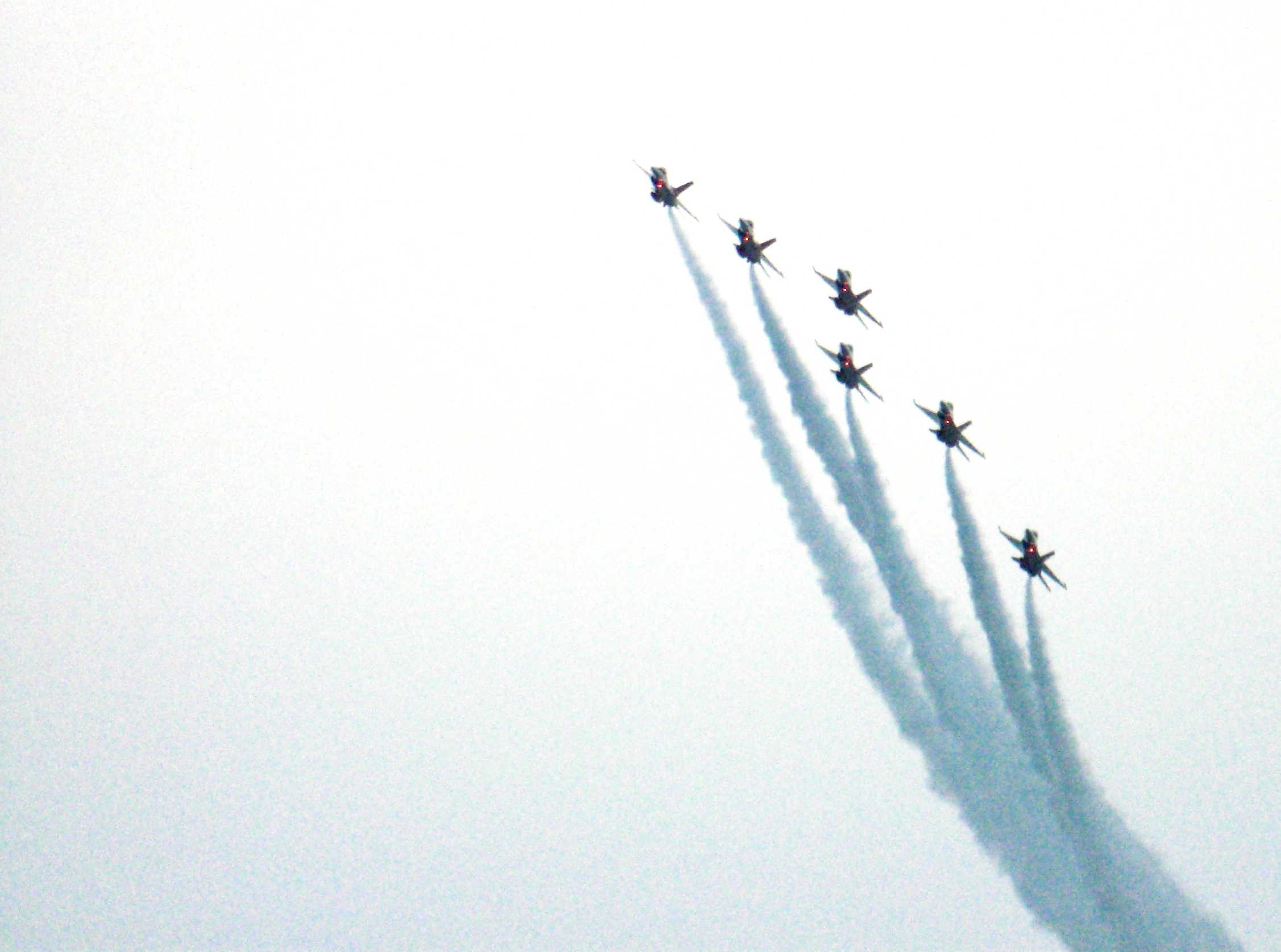
Low level head-on pass during NDP 2008.

=== RSAF Open House 2008 ===
The RSAF Open House is a bi-annual event which is usually held at Paya Lebar Air Base and in conjunction with the 40th anniversary of Republic of Singapore Air Force in 2008, it would be open to public for two days from 30 to 31 August 2008. Also, the RSAF Black Knights are scheduled for another aerobatic display to thrill the crowds.

=== Singapore Airshow 2014 ===
The team will return after a hiatus of almost 6 years at the Singapore Airshow 2014. The Team will feature an all new paint scheme which consist of the crescent moon and five star found on the national flag. The team is scheduled to perform for the crowd on 11 to 16 February.

=== Avalon Airshow 2015 ===
Black Knights 5 and 6 performed at the Avalon Airshow 2015, while 1 was on static display.

=== Golden Jubilee Celebrations|SG 50|NDP15 ===
The team performed on 7, 8 and 9 August at the Marina Barrage as part of Singapore's Golden Jubilee Celebrations. They also performed at National Day Parade, 2015 which included a 5 Star tribute flypast for the late founding father of Singapore Mr Lee Kuan Yew.

== Aircraft operated ==
1. Hawker Hunter – 1973, 1974, 1975, 1977, 1978, 1983
2. F-5E Tiger-II – 1981
3. A-4SU Super Skyhawk – 1990, 1994, 2000
4. F-16A Fighting Falcon – 2000
5. F-16C Fighting Falcon – 2008, 2014, 2015

== See also ==
- VFA-154 Black Knights–A US Navy F/A-18E/F Super Hornet equipped strike fighter squadron of the same namesake.
- VMFA-314—A US Marine Corps Fighter attack squadron of the same namesake
- VMM-264—A US Marine Corps Medium helicopter squadron of the same namesake
- The USAF Thunderbirds—The aerobatics demonstration squadron of the United States Air Force which uses the same aircraft
