= Pulau Tekong =

North-Eastern Island of Singapore

Tekong Island
Malay: Pulau Tekong Chinese: 德光岛 Tamil: புலாவ் தெக்கோங்
- View of Pulau Tekong from the mainland

- Location within Singapore

Geography
- Location: Southeast Asia
- Coordinates: 1°24′29″N 104°03′21″E
- Archipelago: Malay Archipelago
- Area: 40 km^{2} (15 sq mi)

Administration
- Singapore
- Planning Area: North-Eastern Islands

Demographics
- Population: 0 (Military and non-permanent)

Map of Pulau Tekong in Singapore

Pulau Tekong (Singapore English pronunciation: /ˈtəkɒŋ/ TUH-kong), also known as Tekong or Tekong Island, is Singapore's largest outlying island. It lies off the northeastern coast of the mainland, to the east of Pulau Ubin. Since the 1980s, Pulau Tekong has been used by the Singapore Armed Forces (SAF) as a restricted military training ground, with public access prohibited. Transport for permitted personnel is provided via the SAF Changi Ferry Terminal located at Changi Beach.

Historically, various pre-colonial maps recorded the island under different names, and the origins of the name "Tekong" remain the subject of several theories. Pulau Tekong was previously inhabited by a multi-ethnic population of Malays, Chinese and Indians who established agricultural and fishing kampongs across the island. During the British colonial period, the island played a modest role in regional trade and rubber and vegetable farming sustained its economy. During the Japanese occupation of Singapore, residents of Tekong were subjected to forced labour, and many of the island's villages were eventually abandoned following the war.

Since the 1980s, Pulau Tekong has undergone significant land reclamation to support the Singaporean military. The original island, measuring about 25 km^{2} (6,178-acre), was expanded through reclamation along the northwestern coast by absorbing nearby islets, including the former 89-hectare (220-acre) Pulau Tekong Kechil. As of now, its total land area is around 40 km^{2} (9,884-acre), following the completion of the northwestern polder project. Further reclamation works, particularly along the southern coast, are still underway. Once fully completed, Pulau Tekong is projected to reach a total area of between 60 km^{2} (14,830 acres) and 75 km^{2} (18,530 acres).

== Early maps and etymology ==
In 1604, the Bugis–Portuguese cartographer Manuel Godinho de Erédia created one of the earliest maps, JOR: Regno, featuring pre-colonial Singapore in his manuscript, Declaracam de Malaca e da India Meridional com Cathay. It presents a south-north orientation of the Straits of Malacca and depicts Singapore as an island with Pulo Chagni thought to correspond to modern Pulau Tekong Besar (Big Tekong Island).

The toponym "Pulau Tekong" appears in the Franklin and Jackson's 1828 map as Po. Tukang (Pulo Tukang). The early name could have arisen because the island served as a trading station for both residents of Pulau Ubin and the state of Johor. Tukang means merchants in this case. Additionally, between 1822 and 1852, British maps referred to the island by various names, including Great Tookong, Little Tookong, Pulo Takung, Tikong Besar and Tikong Kechi.

The origins of the name "tekong" are steeped in various legends and linguistic interpretations. One story suggests that seafarers navigating by the stars followed a particular celestial body known as the "tekong", which guided them to the island. Another tale recounts the capture of a pirate by a Chinese trading ship in Singapore's waters, where he was brought ashore and had his hair cropped, an act referred to in Malay as "ditokong," and in celebration of this event, islanders named the land Pulau Tokong or Pulau Tekong. A third theory links the name to early settlers from Pahang in modern-day Malaysia, who fled the Pahang Civil War and found refuge on the island, naming it Pulau Tekong in memory of their homeland's district, Teluk Tekong.

Linguistically, "Tekong" has multiple meanings across different languages. Tekong means "an obstacle", so-called because the island blocks the mouth of the Sungai Johor. Additionally, in the Kamus Dewan dictionary, "tekong" is linked to bamboo or sugarcane segments or a rock cleft that collects rainwater. In Indonesian, "tekong" can mean "something wavy or not straight," while in the Minangkabau dialect, it denotes heaviness. Some scholars also believe that "Tekong" originates from the Chinese dialect word "taikong," meaning "ship’s captain."

== History ==
=== 1850s–1960s: Early development ===
==== Early settlements ====
Pulau Tekong was home to a diverse population of migrants from China and the Malay Peninsula, forming a society of immigrants who had made the island their home for more than a century. The Malays were among the first inhabitants, primarily arriving from Pahang and Terengganu. A major wave of migration occurred between 1857 and 1863, when a civil war in Pahang devastated the region, forcing many residents to flee by boat and establish their families along the southwestern coast of Pulau Tekong. Another influx took place between 1891 and 1895, during renewed conflicts between the British ambassador and Pahang chiefs, and some of these migrants formed Kampong Pahang, while others spread across the island, founding settlements such as Kampong Pasir and Kampong Batu Koyok.

Over time, Pulau Tekong became home to numerous villages, including Kampong Selabin, Kampong Permatang, Kampong Pasir Merah, Kampong Unum, Kampong Sungei Belang, Kampong Ayer Samak, Kampong Pasir, Kampong Pengkalan Pakau, Kampong San Yong Kong Parit, Kampong San Yong Kong, Kampong Batu Koyok, Kampong Ladang, Kampong Seminei, Kampong Pahang, and the Chia Tong Quah Estate.

Kampong Pahang served as the island's administrative hub, with its Penghulu (village head) coming from the village itself. The first Penghulu, Ishak, was followed by Tengku Ahmad bin Tengku Sulong as the second, and Jemaat bin Awang as the third. Unlike other villages which focused on fishing or farming, the residents of Kampong Pahang primarily worked in administrative roles or in Changi. Pulau Tekong had a very small Indian community, with fewer than 20 Indians recorded on the island between 1957 and 1969, while the Chinese population, on the other hand, grew significantly in the early 20th century.

==== Rise of businesses ====
During the colonial era, the British actively developed Malaya by bringing in Chinese and Indian labourers. The advances of businesses were closely tied to the colonial government's policies in British Malaya, which actively fostered commercial growth and created numerous opportunities for business expansion. To promote development on Pulau Tekong, the colonial government introduced a policy stating that anyone interested to farm the land could claim ownership. This incentive attracted many Chinese settlers, who began planting gambier and pepper. As rubber plantations on the island expanded quickly, the demand for labour increased, prompting even more Chinese migrants to settle, in which they established villages such as Kampong Sanyongkong Parit, Kampong Sanyongkong, and Chia Tong Quah Estate.

The reason for Hakka being the majority of the Chinese population is that most of the Hokkien and Teochew businessmen already had flourishing businesses on the mainland. When the Hakkas arrived, they decided to make a living on an island less inhabited. Most were inland farmers, (cultivating rubber, vegetables, and raising poultry) with a few shop owners selling sundry goods.

In contrast, the Teochew community settled along the coast, earning their livelihood through fishing, or running grocery stores that sold local goods. Generally, the island’s agriculture included crops such as rubber, vegetables, tobacco, and coconuts which were processed, dried, and exported to Singapore. Overall, agriculture and fishing were the main occupations on Pulau Tekong, supplemented by employment in industry, commerce, and public institutions.

During the late 19th and early 20th centuries, Tekong Island played a vital role as a port. With sailboats being the primary mode of transport at the time, vessels traveling between Tanjong Sulat, Kota Tinggi, and Singapore would dock at Tekong Island when faced with rough seas. Sailors took the opportunity to trade local goods with merchants on the island while also purchasing daily necessities. Traders from Changi and Pulau Ubin were actively involved in commerce on Tekong Island, and its advantageous location spurred economic development, transforming Kampong Selabin into a thriving commercial district.

==== Japanese occupation ====
On 31 January 1942, the Johore Causeway was destroyed, cutting off access to the mainland and leaving Pengerang, Tekong Island, and Singapore as the last British-held territories. To adapt to the situation, the British forces reorganised their defense strategy by positioning the 1st Malaya Infantry Brigade on the right flank, while the Straits Settlements Volunteer Force held the central position in Singapore, and the 2nd Malaya Infantry Brigade on the left flank, covering the Pengerang area and Tekong Island. Furthermore, as Pulau Tekong Besar was considered a more secure location, requiring fewer troops on the mainland, the British relocated heavy artillery, (two 9.2-inch guns) originally intended for Pengerang to Pulau Tekong Besar.

However, on 15 February 1942, Singapore was formally surrendered to the Japanese. Before the Japanese army took control of Singapore, the British had destroyed military equipment (batteries, generators, and vehicles) and left behind sugar, rice, cookies, and cloth canopies on Tekong Island. Prior to the Japanese arrival on Tekong Island, women and children sought refuge in the forest, while the men stayed at road intersections to guard against any Japanese intrusion. Meanwhile, members of a local fundraising group burned all relevant documents to avoid persecution by the Japanese.

A week after the Japanese forces took control of Singapore, they occupied Tekong Island and the Japanese army appointed Penghulu Tengku Ahmad as the village leader and awarded a three-flower medal of honor. Shen Mu Cun received a two-flower medal and was appointed as the leader of the Chinese community. Among the Malay residents, dozens were selected, given a one-flower medal and were tasked with conveying Japanese orders and organising the residents. During the Japanese occupation, men were forced to remove railway tracks, collect metal, cutting trees in rubber plantations, while the Malays were instructed to harvest coconuts, produce coconut oil, and craft attap leaves.

Then, on 2 September 1945, Japan signed the surrender documents, marking the end of World War II. Following their defeat, Japan withdrew from Tekong and Singapore, and the British resumed control of the island.

==== Post-World War II ====
By the late 1950s, Pulau Tekong, the largest of Singapore's outlying islands, had a population of around 4,000 people and was covered with vast forests, swamplands, and diverse flora and fauna. This population remained consistent in 1965 when Singapore became a fully independent republic. 60 percent of the inhabitants were Chinese, out of which 70 percent were Hakkas and 30 percent were Teochews, and 40 percent were Malays. In 1958, it was noted that Pulau Tekong was home to seven Taoist temples, two mosques, two Chinese cemeteries, and eight Muslim cemeteries. By 1966, the island still had three primary schools, all serving Malay students.

After 1965, Singapore experienced rapid development, leading to a gradual decline of Tekong Island, much like other villages in highly developed nations. The island's youth were drawn to Singapore's growth, leaving only the elderly and children behind. Mr. Chen Bo Sheng, 69, a former resident of Tekong, explained that there were essentially two groups: the older generation, who were accustomed to life on Tekong, and the younger generation, eager to explore the world and improve their standard of living. He noted that while many older residents weren’t initially keen on moving, they recognised that relocating to the mainland would provide better career opportunities for their children.

Additionally, the island’s purpose began to shift considerably as it came under the focus of several land development bodies, such as the Housing and Development Board, the Ministry of National Development, the Urban Redevelopment Authority, and the Ministry of Defence.

=== 1970s to present day: Military use ===
==== Relocation of Tekong residents ====
Population growth in Tekong increased, with reports indicating nearly 5,000 residents by the late 1970s, and it was during this period that residents of Pulau Tekong started migrating in groups to Singapore under a government program in which the last group of residents left in 1987. In 1986, the Singapore Ministry of Defence obtained Pulau Tekong for military use. With this transition, the island’s temples were required to form a consortium, register with the Registrar of Societies, and relocate to a united temple in one of Singapore’s industrial zones, now known as the Pulau Tekong United Temple (天降佛堂).

The government’s relocation project was a lengthy and complex process that lasted about eight months. Initially, residents were informed by the authorities that they would need to relocate to the mainland under the new policies and following this, land surveyors measured their properties and assessed the number of crops and livestock they owned. Although the authorities provided financial compensation, many residents felt the amounts offered were inadequate. Former resident, Mr. Lee shared his dissatisfaction:

We were given just $150 for a large durian tree that bore fruit annually. But during the durian season, that tree alone could have earned us $300.

==== Land reclamation ====
Pulau Tekong, as it is known today, initially consisted of two separate islands: Pulau Tekong Besar, the largest natural offshore island in Singapore, commonly referred to simply as Pulau Tekong, and the smaller Pulau Tekong Kecil. Between 1981 and 1985, the Port of Singapore Authority conducted extensive land reclamation along the southern shoreline of the island, expanding its area by approximately 540 hectares.

The initial reclamation took place between 1981 and 1985 on the southern side of Pulau Tekong Besar, where 540 hectares of shallow foreshore and seabed were reclaimed. The project, costing approximately S$620 million, involved the use of 33 million cubic meters of dredged material sourced from offshore areas near Changi and imported from Indonesia. The Urban Redevelopment Authority's (URA) 1991 Concept Plan designated portions of Pulau Ubin and Pulau Tekong for high-density housing to support a growing population in the future. The URA also envisioned that the islands would be connected to the mainland by the Mass Rapid Transit system (MRT).

Starting in February 2002, Malaysian media began reporting claims from local politicians about the potential negative impact of the Pulau Tekong reclamation work on Johor. Malaysia expressed concerns that the reclamation could encroach on its territory or alter the boundary between Singapore and Malaysia. Furthermore, Malaysia expressed concerns that the reclamation could impact the shipping route to Pasir Gudang Port, as the channel had become both narrower and shallower and also lead to alterations to the current flow in the Johor Straits, potentially causing flooding and harming the local fishing industry.

At the time, Minister for National Development Mah Bow Tan dismissed Malaysia's accusations, asserting that the Pulau Tekong reclamation was carried out within Singapore's borders. He also emphasized that the Singapore Maritime Port Authority (MPA) routinely monitored silt levels in the shipping lane to ensure it remained navigable. Furthermore, hydraulic modeling studies were conducted to evaluate the impact of the reclamation on currents, tides, and water quality, which concluded that the project would not have any harmful effects on the surrounding waters.

The issue was ultimately presented to the International Tribunal for the Law of the Sea (ITLOS) and Malaysia was unsuccessful in convincing ITLOS to halt Singapore's reclamation work. Nonetheless, by the end of 2003, ITLOS recommended that both countries collaborate and consult on various measures, including the formation of an independent group of experts to study the effects of Singapore's reclamation and suggest solutions to address any potential negative impacts. Singapore responded by stating that these assurances had already been provided to Malaysia prior to the case being brought before ITLOS. On April 26, 2005, after negotiations, both nations signed a comprehensive and final settlement.

Land reclamation works on the northwestern coasts were completed in September 2025, while reclamation off the southern coast is currently ongoing. In contrast to other land reclamation works at other parts of the country, Singapore has been using the polder method to create new land for Pulau Tekong.

==== Military training ====
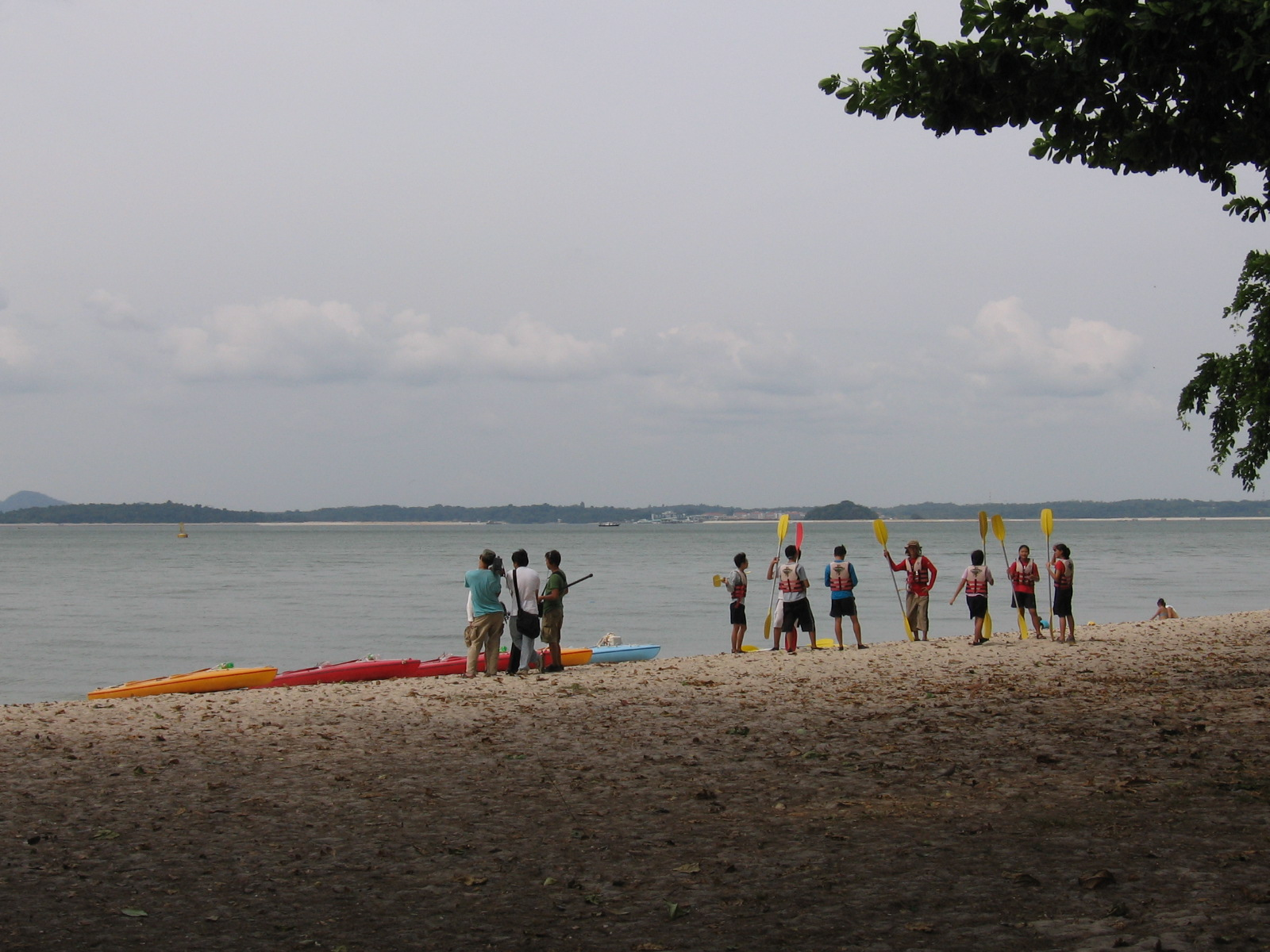
Pulau Tekong lies in the distance in the background, as taken from Changi Beach Park.

The reclaimed area in Pulau Tekong is used exclusively as a training base for the Singapore Army. Pulau Tekong Besar is one of the islands that is a training base for the various Singapore Army with other islands, including Pulau Sudong, Pulau Pawai and Pulau Senang.

The Basic Military Training Centre is based here, where recruits to the Singapore Army are trained in basic military operations. The School of Infantry Specialists (SISPEC) was formerly situated at Rocky Hill Camp. A new training area, called Sanyongkong Field Camp, has been completed on the reclaimed land south of Dogra Bridge. Built by the Combat Engineers, this field camp will be used to train Infantry and Guards battalions.

In March 2004, Pulau Tekong was the hiding place for a group of armed robbers comprising two Indonesians and a Malaysian. The robbers had fled from Malaysia, sparking off a massive coordinated manhunt involving Air Force helicopters, commandos, ground surveillance radar, troops from the 2nd Singapore Infantry Regiment, troops from the 40th Singapore Armoured Regiment and the Singapore Police Force. All three were caught by police officers; two by members of the Gurkha Contingent and one by the Police Coast Guard's Special Task Squadron. They were later charged with illegal entry and possession of firearms.

On 25 September 2006, the Combat Engineers of Singapore Armed Forces handed over a new field camp, Sanyongkong Field Camp, named after a depopulated village Kampong Sanyongkong, after a year of construction. The field camp would allow for longer training periods without returning to mainland Singapore.

=== Geography ===
Wild boars, tigers, dugong, and deer were once plentiful on Pulau Tekong, and this attracted hunters from Singapore. However, Pulo Tekong Besar had undergone so much development after World War II, that the wildlife has mostly disappeared. Among the larger wild mammals, only the wild boar and the dugong are present within Singapore's national borders; the dugong can be found in the coastal waters around Pulau Ubin and Tekong, while the wild boar is located on Tekong.

On 29 May 1990, national servicemen spotted a family of three Asian elephants which had swum 1.5k m (0.9 mi) across the Straits of Johor. The Singapore Zoo worked with the Malaysian Wildlife Department's Elephant Capture and Translocation Unit to help in its plan to recapture the runaway elephants. On 10 June, all three elephants were captured and relocated back to the jungles of Johor.

Currently, it also provides habitat to some wild animals that are rarely seen in the main island of Singapore, such as the leopard cat, Sunda slow loris and Sunda pangolin. The extended Pulau Tekong will massively replace all training grounds, like Mandai, Marsiling, Seletar, Nee Soon, Lower Seletar, Upper Thomson and Simpang. The island also houses Singapore's second hot spring, Pulau Tekong Hot Spring in the former grounds of Kampung Unum.

The National Biodiversity Centre (NBC) and National Parks Board (NParks) has conducted coastal protection and restoration works at the north-eastern coastline of Pulau Tekong to prevent further coastal erosion. The NBC stated that the erosion had resulted from extensive movements of ships and strong waves in the area. A study NParks commissioned in 2006 found that 1.65 km (1.03 mi) of the north-eastern shore is most severely affected.

The coastal erosion poses a threat to the 92 ha (230 acres) of mangroves in Pulau Tekong which is one of the largest mangrove areas in Singapore with a mature and undisturbed habitat. Local ecologists point out that the island is extremely rich in biodiversity and resident to some rare or endangered species, including the Fern Dipteris conjugata.

=== Future Proposals ===
During the National Day Rally 2026 speech, Prime Minister Lawrence Wong made announcements regarding Pulau Tekong. One was ongoing feasibility studies for underground tunnels linking Pulau Tekong to the mainland. In the speech, he also confirmed future plans for continued land reclamation around the southern part of the island. The reclamation is intended for additional training space for the SAF and for future use, the latter due to approximately 500ha of land leftover on the island after accounting for military needs.

== In popular culture ==
- In Singaporean folklore, the island is deemed to be extremely haunted. It is unclear whether the folklore actually dates back to the days when Tekong was inhabited by civilians, or the beliefs sprang up after the island was taken over as military territory.
- The Singapore Broadcasting Corporation (now Mediacorp) Channel 8 drama "Son of Pulau Tekong (亚答籽)" portrayed the lives of the inhabitants of Pulau Tekong before it was turned into a training area for the Singapore Armed Forces.
- The documentary Every Singaporean Son, consisting of 18 episodes, is also based in this area where majority of the scenes are filmed here, and tells the stories about real life recruits serving their Basic Military Training.
- The military movies Ah Boys to Men and Ah Boys to Men 2, both directed by local celebrity film director Jack Neo, are also filmed here and tells the stories about fellow recruits serving their Basic Military Training as well.
- The Mediacorp Channel 8 drama known as The Recruit Diaries, which was released back in 2013, consisting of 13 episodes, was also filmed here and also tells the stories about the fellow recruits serving their Basic Military Training, where the storyline was pretty similar to Jack Neo's Ah Boys to Men and Ah Boys to Men 2.

== Works cited ==
- Barnard, Timothy P., ed. Nature Contained: Environmental Histories of Singapore. NUS Press, 2014.
- Cacciafoco, Francesco Perono and Shia, Zheng Zhe Darwin. "Singapore’s pre-colonial place names: A philological reconstruction developed through the analysis of historical maps." Review of Historical Geography and Toponomastics 15, no. 29-30 (2020): 83-110.
- Chen, Bosheng and Leong, Sze Lee, A Retrospect on the Dust-Laden History: The Past and Present of Tekong Island in Singapore. World Scientific, 2012.
- Chia, L. S., Chou, L. M., and Khan, H. The coastal environmental profile of Singapore. International Center for Living Aquatic Resources, 1988.
- Chung, Daphne SL, and Goh, Beverly PL. "A survey of the soft-bottom benthic fauna of Pulau Tekong." Coastal living resources of Singapore (1990): 53.
- Hue, Guan Thye. “The Evolution of the Singapore United Temple: The Transformation of Chinese Temples in the Chinese Southern Diaspora.” Chinese Southern Diaspora Studies 5 (2011): 164.
- Kennedy, Joseph. When Singapore Fell: Evacuations and Escapes, 1941–42. Palgrave Macmillan UK, 1989. doi: 10.1007/978-1-349-20363-5.
- Lee, Jocelyn Yu Ying, Lim, Colin Ke Long, Loh, See Mun, and Yeo, Irwin Chuan Siang. “Islands in jeopardy: how Singapore's offshore islands lost their heritage,” Thesis, Nanyang Technological University, 2008. https://hdl.handle.net/10356/14853.
- Lin, XS. “Early Period of Chinese Society in Singapore.” In Chinese Association and Businessman. Singapore Society of Asian Studies, 1995.
- Lye, Lin Heng. “WILDLIFE PROTECTION LAWS IN SINGAPORE.” Singapore Journal of Legal Studies, (1991): 288.
- Ong, Chit Chung. Operation Matador: World War II—Britain’s Attempt to Foil the Japanese Invasion of Malaya and Singapore. Marshall Cavendish International (Asia) Private Limited, 2011.
- Rodolphe, De Koninck. Singapore's Permanent Territorial Revolution: Fifty Years in Fifty Maps. NUS Press, 2017.
- Roy, Kaushik. "4 The Siege of Singapore: 4–15 February 1942". In Sepoys against the Rising Sun. Brill, 2016. doi: https://doi.org/10.1163/9789004306783_007
- Savage, Victor R, and Brenda S. A Yeoh. Singapore Street Names: A Study of Toponymics. Marshall Cavendish Editions, 2013.
- Urban Redevelopment Authority (Singapore). Living the next lap: Towards a tropical city of excellence. Urban Redevelopment Authority, 1991.
