= Barn Island =

Barn Island may refer to the following:

- Barn Islands, New Zealand
- Pulau Senang, Singapore
- Barren Island, Brooklyn, New York, United States
