= Pulau Tekong tunnel =

Proposed tunnel between island and mainland Singapore

Coordinates: 1.36518°N 104.039583°E

A tunnel between Pulau Tekong and the Singapore mainland was first proposed in August 2026. The proposed tunnel would be about 1.5 kilometres (0.93 mi).

== History ==
View of Pulau Tekong from mainland Singapore

Pulau Tekong is located in northeastern Singapore and is the country's largest offshore island, used primarily by the Singapore Armed Forces (SAF) for training. The Government first mooted a connection between the Singapore mainland and Pulau Tekong in the 1991 concept plan, which featured a road link through Tanah Merah Coast Road and a rail connection via reclaimed land off eastern Singapore. As of 2026, Pulau Tekong does not have a connection with the Singapore mainland, and SAF personnel have to travel to the island by ferry.

At the 2026 National Day Rally, Singapore Prime Minister Lawrence Wong announced that studies are ongoing for a tunnel connecting Singapore to Pulau Tekong, as a bridge would disrupt heavy shipping traffic in the Johor Strait. Further reclamation works are being planned at the south of Tekong, which would include about 500 hectares (1,200 acres) of land for civilian use. The tunnel might span 1.5 kilometres (0.93 mi).

This will be Singapore's second undersea tunnel project after the Marina Coastal Expressway (MCE), which runs under the seabed of Marina Bay. The MCE was constructed using the cut and cover method, which a National University of Singapore (NUS) professor deemed "unlikely" for the Pulau Tekong tunnel due to the larger length and depth involved.
