= List of extreme points of Singapore =

This is a list of the extreme points of Singapore, the points that are farther north, south, east, or west than any other location in the country. Also included are extreme points in elevation. Both the extreme points for the main island (Pulau Ujong) and the outlying islands of Singapore are indicated.

== Northernmost ==
- Coast of Sembawang, near the Senoko Industrial Estate (1°28′14″N 103°49′2″E) – northernmost point in Singapore
- Sembawang – northernmost residential area in Singapore
- Woodlands North MRT station – northernmost MRT station in Singapore (1°26′56″N 103°49′13″E)
- Sembawang Bus Interchange – northernmost bus interchange in Singapore (1°26′52″N 103°49′10″E)
- Kranji Reservoir – northernmost reservoir (1°24′52″N 103°43′52″E)
- Pulau Ujong – northernmost island in Singapore
- Pulau Seletar – northernmost island outside the main island (1°26′36″N 103°51′44″E)
- Simpang Kiri – northernmost river/stream in Singapore

== Southernmost ==
- Pulau Satumu – southernmost point/island in Singapore (1.1594868°N 103.7406081°E)
- Tuas – southernmost point of the main island
- Sentosa Cove – southernmost residential area in Singapore
- HarbourFront MRT station – southernmost MRT station in Singapore (1.2653894°N 103.8215302°E)
- Beach Station Bus Terminal – southernmost bus terminal in Singapore
- HarbourFront Bus Interchange – southernmost bus interchange on the main island
- Marina Reservoir – southernmost reservoir in Singapore (1.2868653°N 103.8672156°E)
- Singapore River – southernmost river/stream in Singapore (1.2925211°N 103.8346514°E)

== Easternmost ==
- Pedra Branca – easternmost island/point in Singapore (1.3304872, 104.4061449)
- Changi Bay – easternmost point on the main island
- Changi Village – easternmost residential area in Singapore (1.3887059, 103.9879802)
- Changi Airport MRT station – easternmost MRT station in Singapore (1.3574790, 103.9878836)
- Changi Airport PTB 1, 2 and 3 Bus Terminal – easternmost bus terminal in Singapore
- Changi Creek Reservoir – easternmost reservoir in Singapore (1.3858650, 103.9949888)
- Sungei Changi – easternmost river/stream in Singapore (1.3906376, 103.9893790)

== Westernmost ==
- Tuas – westernmost point in Singapore
- Jurong West – westernmost residential area in Singapore
- Tuas Link MRT station – westernmost MRT station in Singapore (1.3408824, 103.6369914)
- Tuas Bus Terminal – westernmost bus terminal in Singapore (1.3416562, 103.6393400)
- Tengeh Reservoir – westernmost reservoir in Singapore (1.3457776, 103.6469504)
- Sungei Ulu Pandan – westernmost river/stream in Singapore (1.3247995, 103.7559847)

== Extremes in elevation ==
- Bukit Timah Hill (534 feet (163 m)) – highest point in Singapore
- Singapore Strait, Strait of Johor (0 metres/sea level) – lowest point in Singapore

== Other ==
- Geographic center of Singapore island: approximately the midway of the MacRitchie Reservoir and the Upper Peirce Reservoir

== See also ==
- Extreme points of Asia
- Extreme points of Earth
- Geography of Singapore
