= Pulau Pawai =

Name transcription(s)
  - Chinese: 巴歪岛
  - Pinyin: bāwāi dǎo
  - Malay: Pulau Pawai
- Location of Pulau Pawai within Singapore
- Coordinates: 1.1857°N 103.7246°E
- Country: Singapore

Pulau Pawai, also known as Alligator Island during the colonial times, is a 182,000-square-metre (1,959,032-square-foot) island located within the Singapore Armed Forces Live Firing Area. It is located off the southwestern coast of Singapore, between Pulau Sudong to its north and Pulau Satumu to its south. It is one of the three islands owned by the Singapore Armed Forces for live firing exercises, the other two being Pulau Sudong and Pulau Senang.

== Live Firing Area (Southern Islands) ==
Since 9 June 1989, the island together with Pulau Senang and Pulau Sudong, these three islands formed the Singapore Armed Forces southern islands military training area and live-firing zone. As with all other military installations within the country, the entire live-firing zone is strictly off limits to all civilians at all times of the day and night.

The island is used mainly as a practice range for live-ammunition bombing both from the air and the ground. The Republic of Singapore Air Force and Navy take turns to use it, with the Air Force practicing strafing and the Navy practicing shelling targets.

Pawai's lush green and brown forests are mostly undisturbed and it has been found to have a rich biodiversity of coral reefs, especially fringing reefs.

== Etymology ==
"Pawai" means cortège (French: procession, retinue) or suite of the Raja, so presumably the retinue of the Raja stayed on this island.

== Panorama ==
The Southern Islands, Singapore. Panoramic view of Pulau Satumu (Raffles Lighthouse), Pulau Biola, Pulau Senang, Pulau Pawai and Pulau Sudong, from Pulau Semakau. (Note: This is as close as you can get to see the islands due to its military sensitivity.)
