= Action of 13 December 1964 =

- Part of Indonesia–Malaysia confrontation
Date	13 December 1964
Location	1 mile off Raffles Lighthouse, Singapore Strait 1°09′36.2″N 103°44′27.2″E
Result	Australian victory

Belligerents
Australia	Indonesia

Commanders and leaders
(Australia) Keith Murray	(Indonesia) Unknown

Strength
1 minesweeper	2 sampans

Casualties and losses
1 wounded	3 killed 4 captured 1 sampan captured

The action of 13 December 1964 was a minor naval action between the Australian minesweeper HMAS Teal and two Indonesian vessels on 13 December 1964 during the Indonesia–Malaysia confrontation. HMAS Teal was engaged by Indonesian vessels in the Singapore Strait. Return fire from the Australian ship killed three, whilst four other Indonesians were subsequently captured.

== Action ==
HMAS Teal whilst conducting patrols of the Singapore Strait intercepted two Indonesian sampans 1 mile from Raffles Lighthouse. Upon interception of the unlit sampans, Teal was fired upon with automatic weapons from the sampans. The sampans turned towards Indonesian waters, however one sampan was overpowered by Teal following further small arms engagements that killed three of the seven Indonesian crew members. The remaining crew, including an officer of the Indonesian Marines, surrendered. On board the sampan, a quantity of explosives, weapons and military equipment was found.

== Aftermath ==
Lieutenant Keith Murray was awarded the Distinguished Service Cross, for his coolness and judgement during the action. The Distinguished Service Cross was the only award for gallant or distinguished service made to the Royal Australian Navy during the Indonesia–Malaysia confrontation.

== See also ==
- Military history of Australia during the Indonesia–Malaysia Confrontation
