= Pulau Sudong =

- Subzone of Western Islands Planning Area

Name transcription(s)
  - Chinese: 苏东岛
  - Pinyin: sūdōng dǎo
  - Malay: Pulau Sudong
  - Tamil: சுடோங் தீவு
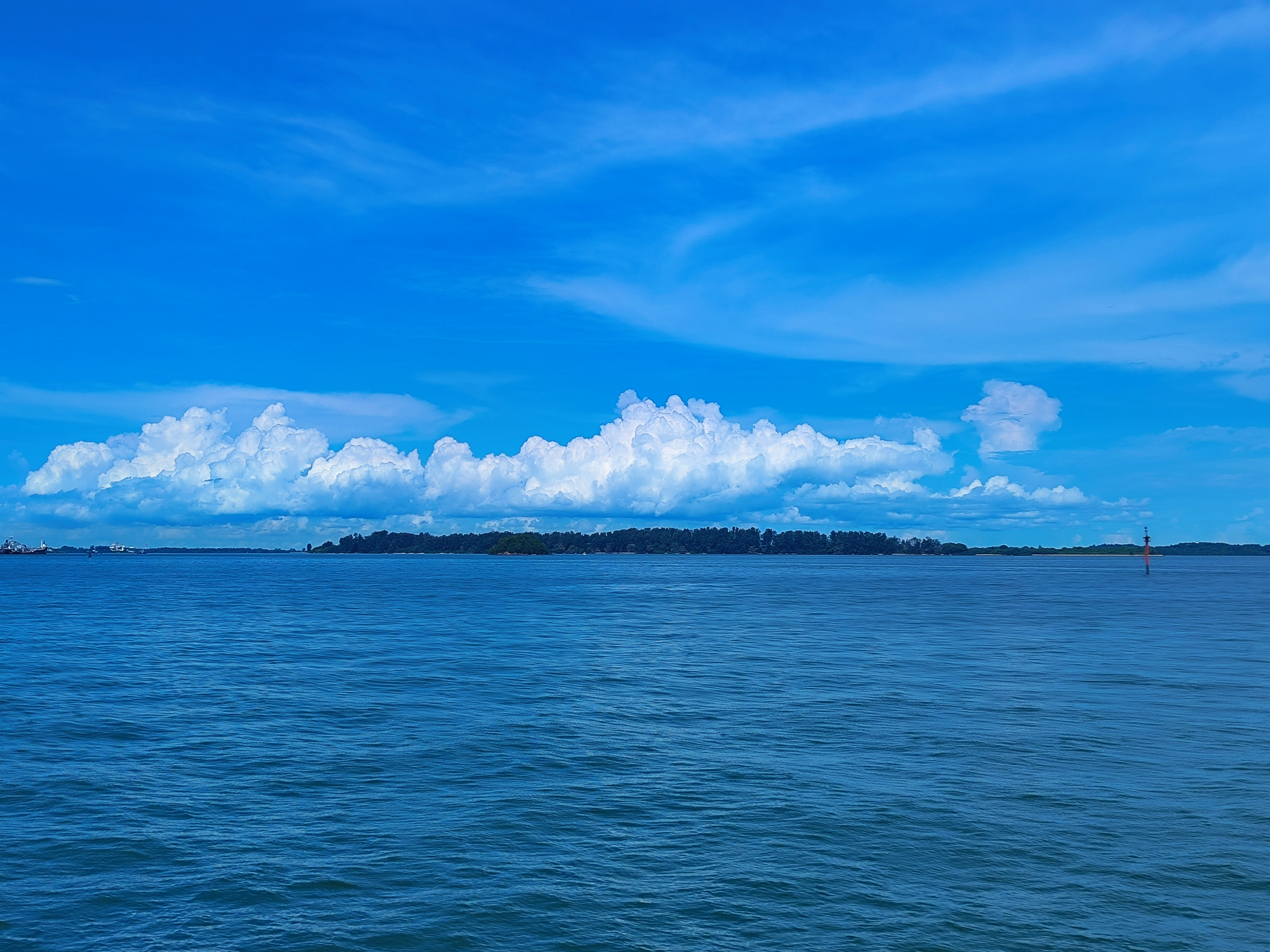
- Pulau Sudong in June 2026

- Location of Pulau Sudong within Singapore
- Coordinates: 1.2059°N 103.7195°E
- Country: Singapore

Pulau Sudong (Malay for Sudong Island) is a 209 hectares (520 acres) coral island off the southern coast of Singapore. It was enlarged through a land reclamation process during the late 1970s, and is home to the Pulau Sudong Airport.

== Restricted area ==
Since the early 1980s, Pulau Sudong, together with Pulau Senang and Pulau Pawai, have formed the Singapore Armed Forces southern islands military training area and live-firing zone. As with all other military installations in Singapore, the entire live-firing zone is strictly off limits to all civilians at all times of the day and night. The only exceptions to this are for workers who are contracted by MINDEF to perform maintenance on the island's area calibration facilities.

The island's airport and dock are maintained by the Singapore Armed Forces (SAF), with most areas covered by dense vegetation - the island is a wildlife haven for migratory birds and plants alike. The airstrip is only utilised for emergencies that involve military aircraft.

== Etymology and history ==
Sudong comes from the same root word as tudong in Malay, a cone-shaped food cover made from matting, which is also used as head covering by padi planters.

The government malaria research station was formerly located on the island for a period in the 1940s.

Prior to the airstrip being built, it was home to around 400 permanent inhabitants that lived in kampongs. In 2015, the former island inhabitants petitioned to be allowed back to the island for a day to fulfill their dying wish. However, their request was denied.

The Southern Islands, Singapore. Panoramic view of Pulau Satumu (Raffles Lighthouse), Pulau Biola, Pulau Senang, Pulau Pawai and Pulau Sudong, from Pulau Semakau. (Note: This is as close as you can get to see the islands due to its military sensitivity.)

== Sources ==
- Victor R Savage, Brenda S A Yeoh (2004), Toponymics - A Study of Singapore Street Names, Eastern University Press, ISBN 981-210-364-3
