= Barn Islands =

Island in New Zealand

- Interactive map of Barn Islands

Geography
- Coordinates: 44.0806°S 168.30451°E

Administration
- New Zealand
- Region: West Coast

Demographics
- Population: uninhabited

Barn Islands are a group of islands off the Barn Bay in the West Coast Region, New Zealand.

== See also ==
- List of islands of New Zealand
