= Western Islands, Singapore =

Western Islands
- Planning Area

Other transcription(s)
  - Chinese: 西部群岛
  - Pinyin: Xībù qúndǎo
  - Malay: Kepulauan Barat
  - Tamil: மேற்கத்திய தீவுகள்
- Location of Western Islands in Singapore
- Country: Singapore
- Region: West

Government
  - Mayors: South West CDC: Low Yen Ling
  - Members of Parliament: West Coast–Jurong West GRC: Cassandra Lee; Desmond Lee

Area
  - Total: 45.81 km^{2} (17.69 sq mi)
  - Rank: 4th

Population (2026)
  - Total: 0
  - Density: 0.0/km^{2} (0.0/sq mi)

Ethnic groups

The Western Islands is a planning area located within the West Region of Singapore. It comprises a collection of islands located in the south-western waters of Singapore, namely Jurong Island, Pulau Bukom, Pulau Semakau, and Pulau Sudong, on which is the Pulau Sudong Airport.

The Western Islands originally comprised 27 islands, once home to the native Malay islanders in the past. In the 1990s, the government decided to reclaim land to form one major island, called Jurong Island. It was subsequently formed from the amalgamation of several offshore islands, chiefly the seven main islands of Pulau Ayer Chawan, Pulau Ayer Merbau, Pulau Merlimau, Pulau Pesek Besar, Pulau Pesek Kechil, Pulau Sakra, Pulau Soraya, Pulau Hantu Besar, and Pulau Hantu Kechil.

The planning area is located on the Singapore Straits, with Tuas situated to its west, as well as Pioneer, Boon Lay, Jurong East and Queenstown to its north. Western Islands planning area also shares a maritime boundary with the Southern Islands to its east. It has three subzones, Jurong Island and Bukom, Semakau and Sudong.

== Location ==
Although called 'Western Islands', the islands are not actually located on the west of the main island of Singapore. They are in fact located south-west of the main island. The islands are also relatively near to the Southern Islands.

== Jurong Island ==
Jurong Island is the biggest and most important island among the Western Islands. It serves as the petroleum and petrochemical hub of the city-state, and it houses the third largest refining centre in the world. Jurong Island is home to over 94 petroleum, petrochemical, specialty chemical and supporting companies with more than S$26 billion in fixed assets investment on Jurong Island. Multinational companies such as ExxonMobil and Shell have established a strong presence on Jurong Island.

Jurong Island is linked to the main island by a 2.3 km causeway known as the Jurong Island Highway, opened in March 1999. Access to the island is restricted to persons who have a Jurong Island Security Pass. Other restrictions include that one must declare any photographic equipment that they are bringing to the island.

== Politics ==
The Western Islands of Singapore was formed under the Southern Islands Constituency which comprises both these islands and Southern Islands. The constituency was dissolved in 1968 due to declining electorate and the Western Islands was absorbed into Jurong SMC which remained as it was until 1997 when it was redistricted to the short-lived Bukit Timah GRC, followed by the West Coast-Jurong West GRC since 2001 (under the name West Coast GRC until its renaming in 2025).
