= Pulau Senang =

Name transcription(s)
  - Chinese: 安乐岛
  - Pinyin: Ānlè Dǎo
  - Malay: Pulau Senang
  - Tamil: புலாவ் செனாங்
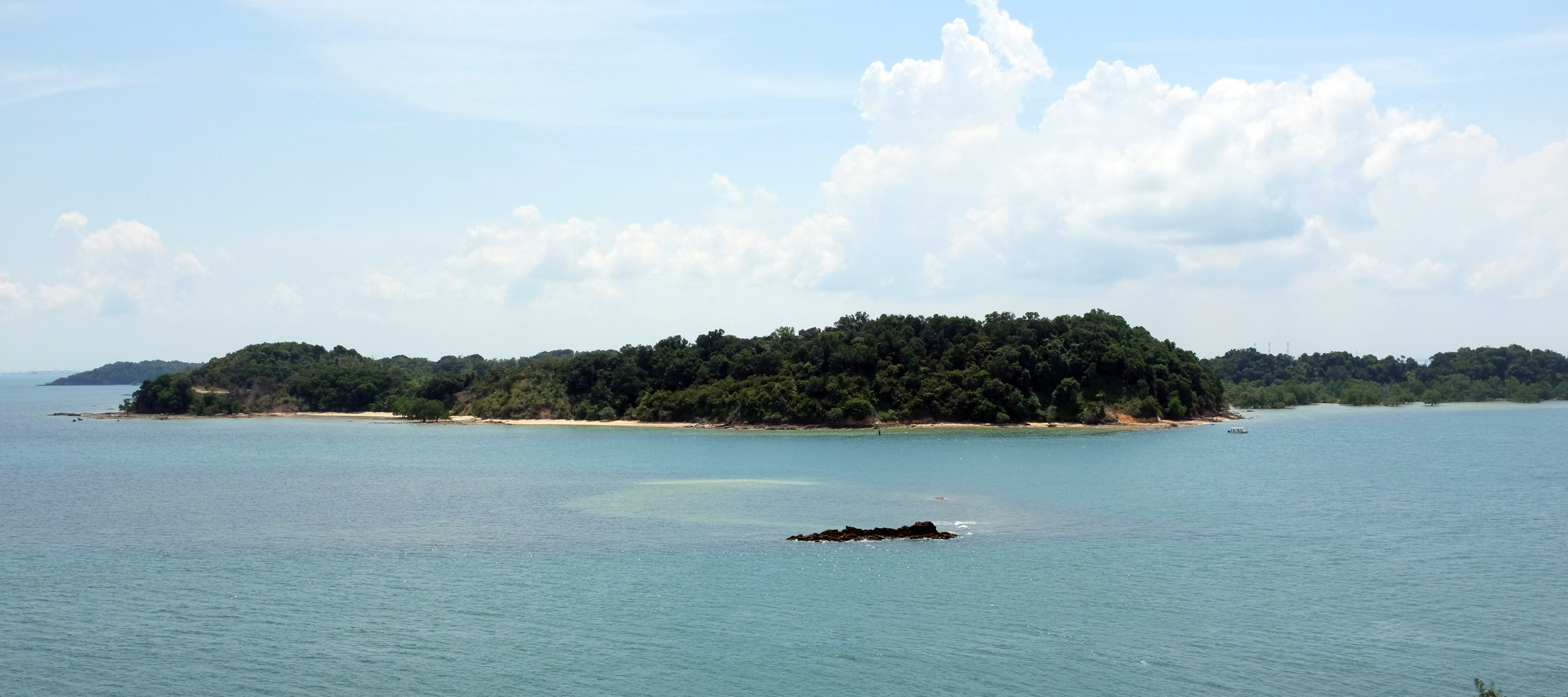

- Location of Pulau Senang within Singapore
- Coordinates: 1°10′14″N 103°44′10″E
- Country: Singapore

Area
  - Total: 81.7 ha (202 acres)

Population
  - Total: 0

Pulau Senang is an 81.7-hectare (202-acre) coral island in the Republic of Singapore, located about 13 kilometres (8.1 mi) off the southern coast of Singapore Island. Along with Pulau Pawai to the north-west and Pulau Sudong, further north from Pulau Pawai, it is used as a military training area for live-fire exercises carried out by the Singapore Armed Forces (SAF).

Pulau Senang is best known in the history of Singapore as the location of a former experimental offshore penal settlement. It failed after only three years, following an infamous riot against the small unit of prison authorities (no more than 10) which broke out in 1963, resulting in the death of four officers, including the prison chief.

== Etymology ==
In Malay, Pulau Senang literally translates as the "Easy Island".

== Prison riot ==
In 1960, an experimental offshore penal colony was established on Pulau Senang by the Singapore government. The prisoners, predominantly gangsters, were allowed to move freely about the island, and were engaged in manual labour. It was envisioned that the detainees could be reformed through hard work and be sent home with an ability to seek lawful employment.

The prison-settlement started on 18 May 1960, when 50 detainees, sent from Changi Prison, arrived with Irish-born Prisons Superintendent Daniel Dutton, the appointed chief of the penal settlement. Over the next three years, the number of detainees from the mainland rose to 320 and together they transformed the island into an attractive settlement, albeit one for criminals only.

However, a riot broke out three years after the prison was established, resulting in the deaths of four prison officers, including Dutton. 18 men were convicted of murder and hanged. As a result, the penal settlement was shut down in 1964.

== Restricted area ==
Since 9 June 1989, the island, together with Pulau Pawai and Pulau Sudong, have formed the Singapore Armed Forces (SAF) Southern Islands Live-Firing Area (SILFA), renamed to just "Training Plot S", a restricted military training area and live-firing zone. As with all other military areas in the country, the entire live-firing zone is strictly off-limits at all times to civilians and unauthorised vessels. In Training Plot S, the Republic of Singapore Air Force (RSAF) conducts military exercises, including aerial bombing and parachute/rappelling practices. On Pulau Sudong there is a runway and a small control-tower used by military planes flying to nearby Pulau Pawai, on which there are a series of artificial ground-targets for bombing exercises. The Republic of Singapore Navy (RSN) occasionally uses SILFA for naval gunnery drills and exercises.

== Panorama ==
The Southern Islands, Singapore. Panoramic view of Pulau Satumu (Raffles Lighthouse), Pulau Biola, Pulau Senang, Pulau Pawai and Pulau Sudong, from Pulau Semakau. (Note: This is as close as you can get to islands due to their military use.)
