= Pulau Biola =

Islet in the Singapore Strait

Violin Island
Pulau Biola 比奥拉岛 புலாவ் பியோலா
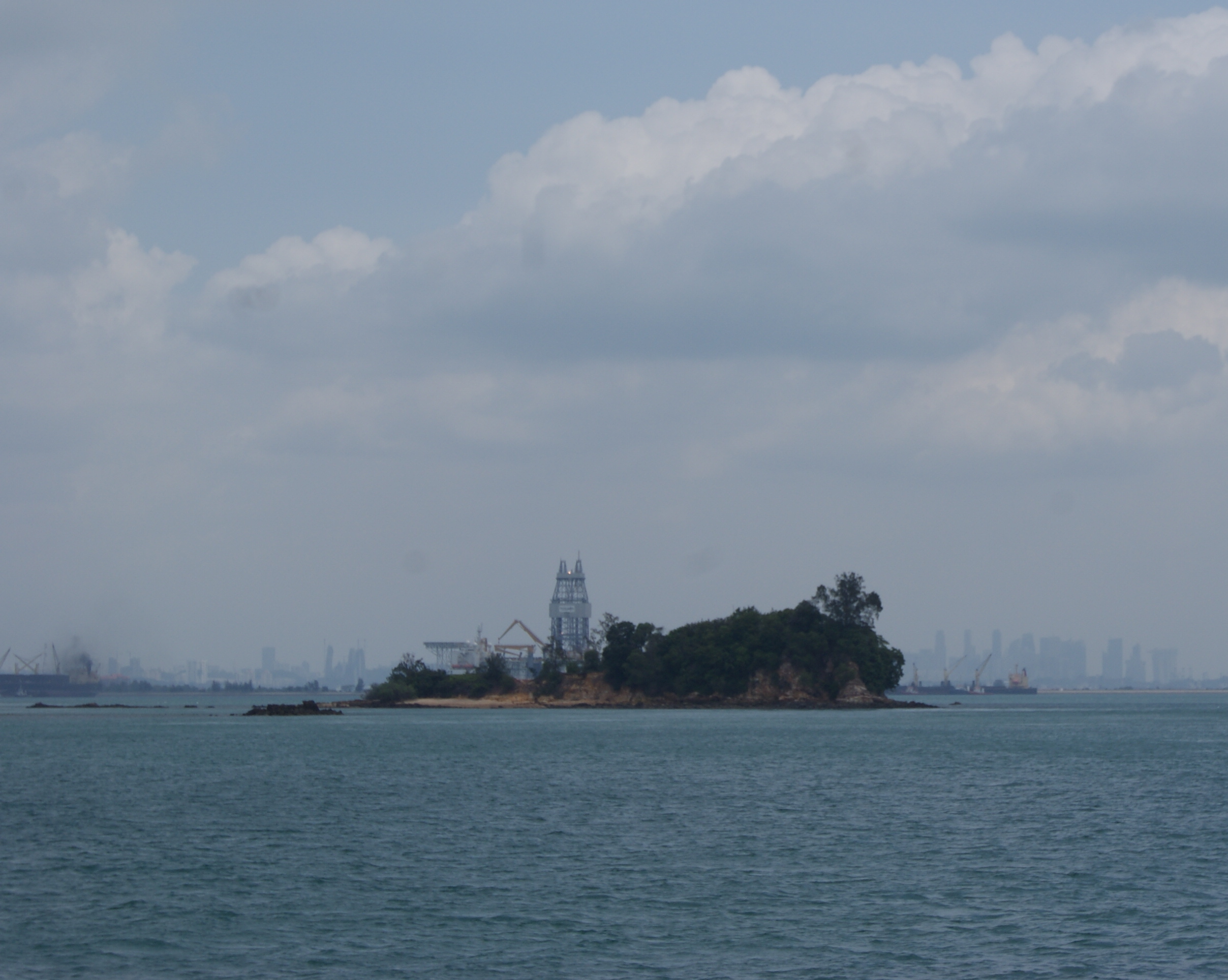
- Pulau Biola in 2011

- Location within Singapore
- Other names: Rabbit Island

Geography
- Location: Southeast Asia
- Coordinates: 1°09′33″N 103°44′27″E
- Archipelago: Malay Archipelago
- Area: 0.4 ha (0.99 acres)

Administration
- Singapore
- Planning Area: Southern Islands

Pulau Biola (Note: (Chinese: 比奥拉岛; pinyin: Bǐ'àolā dǎo; English: Violin Island)) is a small islet situated in the Singapore Strait. The island lies between Pulau Satumu, where Raffles Lighthouse is located, to the south, and Pulau Senang to the north. The Sentosa Development Corporation manages Pulau Biola and nine other offshore islands for the Singaporean government. When compared to other parts of Singapore, the islet is renowned for its abundant biodiversity of coral reefs and marine life, which remain comparatively untouched. It has an area of 0.4 hectares (0.99 acres).

== Etymology ==
The Portuguese-derived Malay word biola means "violin," while pulau means "island" or "piece of rising ground in a sea." Rabbit Island is another name for Pulau Biola in English. Early English navigators at the period gave the region the moniker, according to a 1936 newspaper story.

== Geography ==
Pulau Biola lies approximately 400 yards (370 m) southeast of the southeastern tip of Pulau Senang. The islet is approximately 150 yards north-south in length and reaches an elevation of approximately 21 metres (69 ft). It is fringed by a reef up to 400 yards to the northeast. About a quarter mile offshore from the island, a distinct reef is exposed at low tide, drying up to heights ranging from 0.3 to 1.2 metres (1 to 4 feet), and the sea bed drops to a depth of 20 metres just to the south of it. Another patch of drying ground appears on the northwest edge of this reef. North of Pulau Biola is a labyrinth of shoals and reefs, consisting of drying reefs and sand cays, between the islet and the surrounding islands such as Pulau Semakau and Pulau Sebarok. The south limit ofthis system of reefs is a line from the Pulau Biola lighthouse to Pulau Sebarok. Geologically, Pulau Biola is a coastally and subaerially shaped rock island and it consists primarily of Triassic sandstones.

== History ==
French royal cartographer Jacques-Nicolas Bellin included Pulau Biola on a navigation map in 1755 and marked that the islet, though small, was a notable navigational feature prior to Singapore's being British. Bellin charted the island as a violin—or, preferably, a lute—having two protuberances at one end and a curvilinear body at the other. This odddrawing is where Singapore most likely earned its name "Biola," Malay for violin. Of particular interest to modern-day historians is Bellin's labeling of Singapore as Pulo or Isle Panjang (Long Island), with Pulau Biola, noted Isle la Viole, appearing just above the Detroit du Gouverneur (Governor's Strait). This would be roughly the southern extremity of Singapore's southern islands today. Pulau Biola is also mentioned in the 1982 announcement of the New Southern Islands Live Firing Area.

== Flora and fauna ==
A few plant species have been recorded in Pulau Biola's surroundings, including Arachnis hookeriana, Bryopsis corymbosa, Cystoseira triquetra, Cystoseira prolifera, and Palaemonella rotumana. Pemphis acidula, a mangrove; Portulaca pilosa, typically found on rocky and sandy shores; and Fagraea auriculata, a threatened plant with only two other recorded locations in Singapore—Lazarus Island and Pulau Tekukor—are locally threatened plants that inhabit the island. Pulau Biola is also renowned for its rich marine life and extensive coral reefs, which have made it one of the premier diving spots in Singapore. The reefs and the surrounding marine life are often said to be among the least disturbed in the country's territorial waters.
