= Pulau Satumu =

Islet in the Singapore Strait

Satumu Island
Pulau Satumu 沙都姆岛 புலாவ் சாதுமு
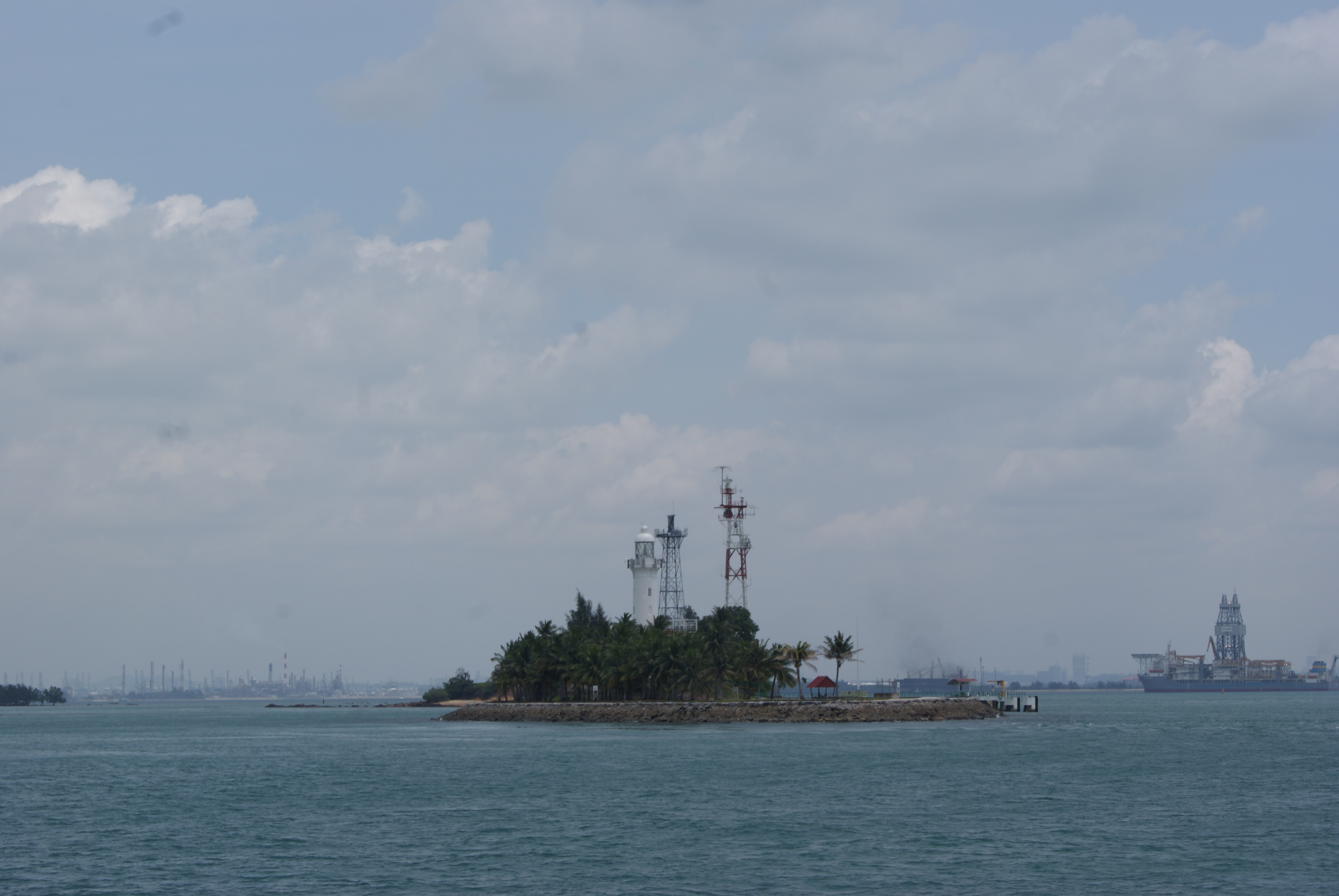
- Pulau Satumu in 2011

- Location within Singapore
- Other names: Coney Island

Geography
- Location: Southeast Asia
- Coordinates: 1°09′33″N 103°44′27″E
- Archipelago: Malay Archipelago
- Area: 1.3 ha (3.2 acres)

Administration
- Singapore
- Planning Area: Western Islands

Pulau Satumu (Note: (Chinese: 沙都姆岛; pinyin: Shādōumǔ dǎo; English: Satumu Island)) is a small islet situated in the Singapore Strait. It marks the southernmost point within Singapore's territorial waters and belongs to the cluster of islands southwest of the mainland commonly referred to as the Western Islands. The islet is also popularly known as Raffles Lighthouse or Raffles Light, named after the lighthouse located on it. It has an area of 1.3 hectares (3.2 acres).

== Etymology ==
In a Singapore survey, the origin of names for a number of surrounding islands was cited, including the playful names "the Rabbit" and "the Coney." The two sandstone islands, each topped with a scattering of trees, were recalled for their playful names, which had no definitemeaning. The resemblance of the rabbit and the coney was questioned, with one report indicating that although English sailors observed the forms of rabbits, local Malay people named the islets "Pulo Biola," orfiddle. The notion that the islets bear resemblance to the animals to which they were named was reinforced by other observers as they observed their definite appearance like a rabbit and a coney.

Pulau Serangoon in northeastern Singapore has also been referred to as Coney Island. The island was named by Ghulam Mahmood, who hoped to sell it as a holiday destination by associating it with the popular New York site. Before the foundation stone of the lighthouse was laid in 1854, the name Raffles Lighthouse, named after Stamford Raffles, was already surfacing in local media. The name was first used as "the Coney" or "Coney Island" in East India Company (EIC) ship journals and logs as early as 30 August 1762. Even after the Raffles Lighthouse was completed in 1855, the name "Coney Island" was still prevalent.Malay words for "one" or "single" plus the name of a species of mangrove tree are the origin of Pulau Satumu (also known as Setumu). It is unclear when Coney Island was renamed Pulau Satumu, but the name was mentioned in a 1954 newspaper article commemorating the lighthouse's centennial.

== History ==
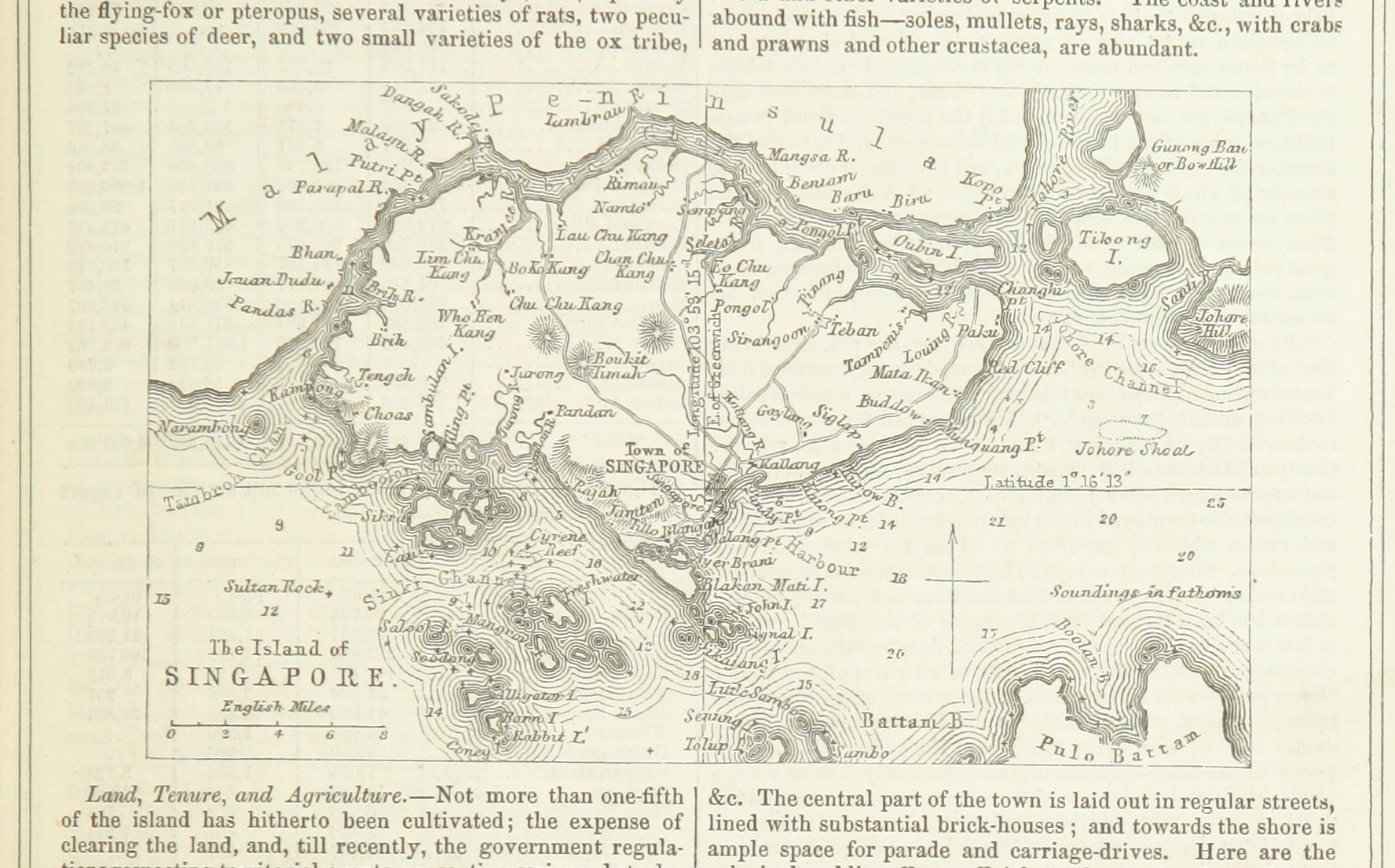
Map of Singapore from the Imperial Gazetteer (1874)

Early 17th century navigational maps indicate that Chinese tributary missions during the early Ming Dynasty, conducted between 1405 and 1433, and possibly led by Admiral Zheng He, have been theorised to have sailed near Pulau Satumu. If so, this would be one of the earliest references made to the islands in the region. Two of the very first written descriptions of the Rabbit and Coney islands were done by John Crawfurd during a diplomatic journey from India to Siam and back in 1822 aboard the John Adams. On 19 January, he said he sailed along the narrow channel that separated the islands, and he likened the area to being edged with green, verdant isles. On the homeward journey on 23 November, Crawfurd and his companions landed at an adjacent island, collecting botanical specimens and remarking on the profusion and novelty of the country's plant life.Nathaniel Wallich's report is considered to be the first recorded natural history sighting of the islands around Coney Island. In the same time period, on 31 October 1822, William S. Collinson, John Croft Hawkins and Robert Moresby, aboard the Prince of Wales, also mentionedthe Coney and the Rabbit in their pilot book for entering the Straits of Singapore by the northeast passage.

The Rabbit and the Coney were mentioned again in connection with Crawfurd's circumnavigating survey of Singapore and the surrounding islands in August 1825. Described in the Singapore Chronicle in November of the same year, the survey reported the islets as "two masses of sandstone with a few trees." The expedition concluded with the arrival of the survey party at the two islets, but the subsequent ceremony marked the start of something new, an almost hundred and fifty years of colonial presence. During that visit, the party fell on the Rabbit and Coney and formally took them into possession with a 21-gun salute. The islets, by now familiar to navigators, were declared the southwestern boundary of British dominion, extended, it was claimed, a full one hundred geographical miles in circumference.

Only two significant natural history-related trips to Coney Island existed prior to the construction of the lighthouse. Geologist-explorer James Richardson Logan and surveyor John Turnbull Thomson each noted the geology of the island on their travels.

In 1958, Hans and Lotte Hass, ocean biologists, shot the islet for their underwater footage, seen by millions. The reefs are still among the most pristine in Singapore waters, though with a slight decline in the percentage of coral cover over the decades. The rest of the marine lifeon and around the islet is still under-researched, though plenty has been done.

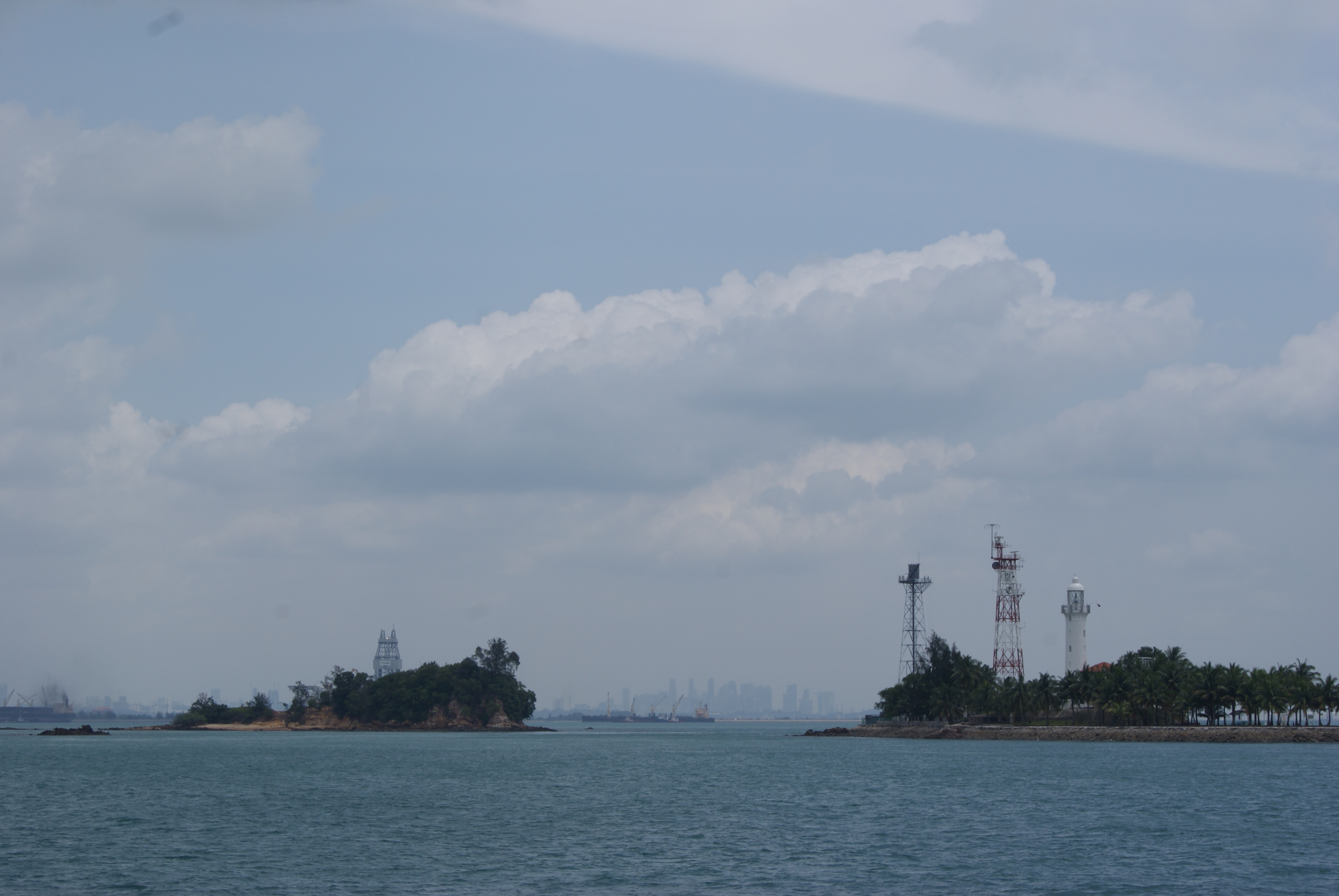
Pulau Biola and Pulau Satumu in 2011

Due to reclamation activities which affected other islands in Singapore, Pulau Satumu gained an artificial lagoon and grew by approximately one hectare during the 1970s. The islet and its 300-metre (980 ft) immediate vicinity are today a restricted area normally closed to the public. Pulau Satumu and nearby Pulau Biola were designated as priority marine conservation sites under Singapore's Blue Plan 2018.

== Raffles Lighthouse ==
The risks around Coney Island, which marked the entrance to the Singapore Strait, were widely recognised, despite the fact that trips to the islet were rare. While on board HMS Wolf in 1832, it was observed that cautious steering was necessary when travelling close to Coney Island. Discussions on constructing a lighthouse on the islet date back to 1833. On 24 May 1854, precisely four years after the Horsburgh Lighthouse on Pedra Branca had undergone a similar ceremony, the lighthouse's foundation stone was set. The Raffles Lighthouse on Coney Island went into service on 1 November 1855, less than 18 months later.
