= Pulau Semakau =

- Subzone of Western Islands Planning Area

Name transcription(s)
  - Chinese: 实马高岛
  - Pinyin: Shímǎgāodǎo
  - Malay: Pulau Semakau
  - Tamil: செமாக்காவ் தீவு
- Location of Pulau Semakau within Singapore
- Coordinates: 1°12′22″N 103°45′43″E
- Country: Singapore

Pulau Semakau (or Semakau Island) is located to the south of the main island of Singapore, off the Straits of Singapore. The Semakau Landfill is located on the eastern side of the island, and was created by the amalgamation of Pulau Sakeng (also known as Pulau Seking), and "anchored" to Pulau Semakau. The Semakau Landfill is Singapore's first offshore landfill and now the only remaining landfill in Singapore.

== History ==
Pulau Semakau was home to a small fishing village, as was the nearby island of Pulau Sakeng (Chinese: 锡京岛) which was also known as Pulau Seking. Houses built on both islands were perched on stilts as most of the villagers were subsistence fishermen, making a living off the nearby coral reefs. Both islands had a few provision shops but the community centre was located on Pulau Semakau while the Pulau Sakeng Police Post (staffed by a Marine Police officer of the Singapore Police Force) was situated on Pulau Sakeng.

In 1987, the Singapore government, after having acquired the land on both islands from the islanders, set about relocating the islanders to the mainland where they were resettled in the Bukit Merah and Telok Blangah housing estate areas by HDB. One of the oldest residents continued to live on the Pulau Sakeng despite his family having been resettled but he eventually moved out as well in 1991, as the island's jetty fell into a state of disrepair. The Singapore SPCA was tasked with rounding up the few cats that were left behind after his departure.

Plans for the landfill were first announced in February 1989.

Subsequently, Pulau Sakeng was subsumed by the land reclamation process of Pulau Semakau and the present day Semakau landfill receiving station was built directly on top of Pulau Sakeng after that process.

== Barramundi fish farming ==
Pulau Semakau and the neighbouring area is the home to the largest barramundi farm in Singapore, owned by Barramundi Asia (Kühlbarra). The location is chosen for its strong current and high oxygen content, necessary for strong growth of the fish.

== Semakau landfill ==
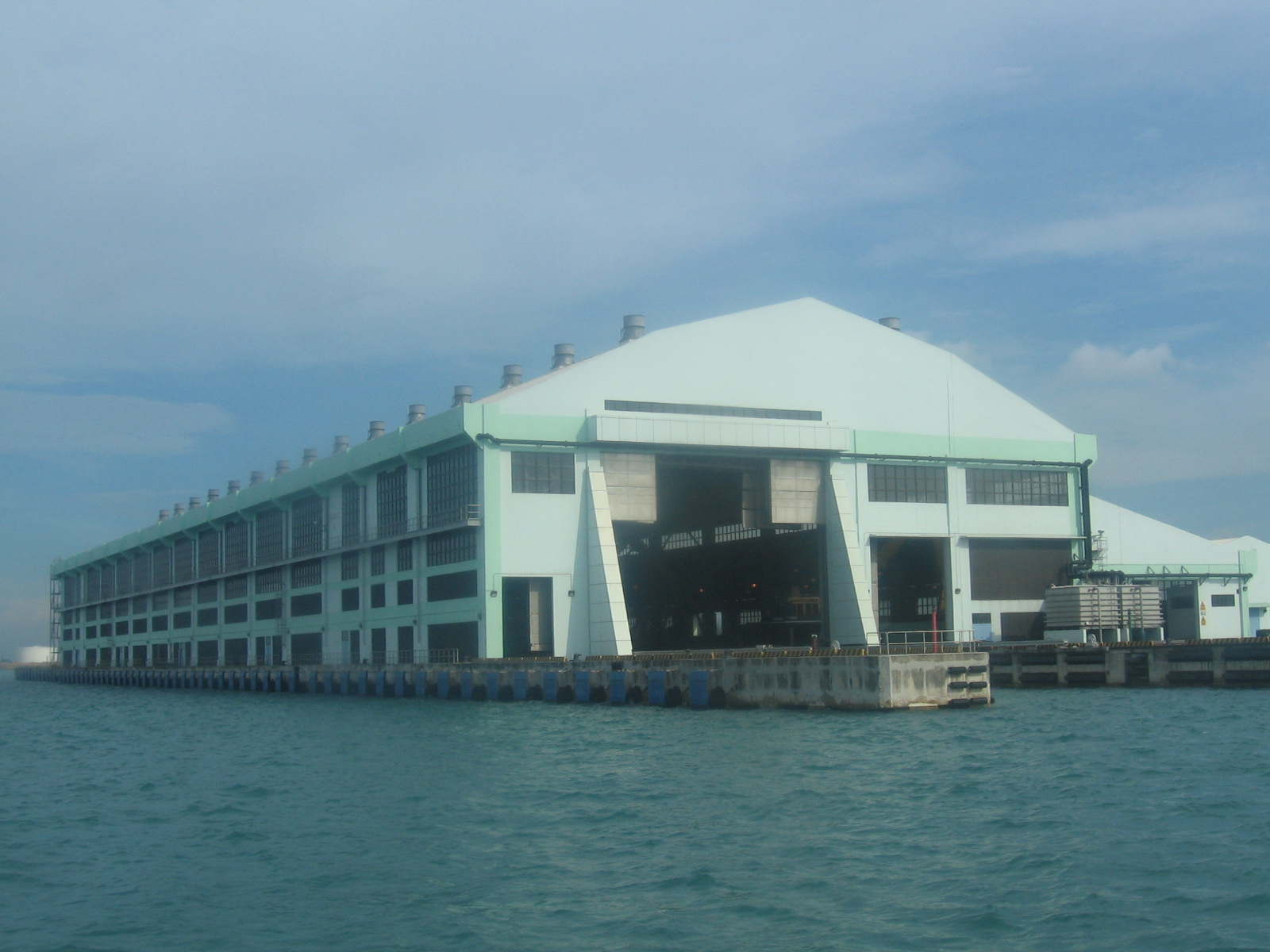
Semakau landfill receiving station

The Semakau Landfill is Singapore's first and only landfill situated offshore among the southern islands of Singapore. It covers a total area of 3.5 square kilometres and has a capacity of 63 million m³. To create the required landfill space, a 7 km perimeter rock bund was built to enclose a part of the sea between Pulau Semakau and Pulau Sakeng. As of August 2011 it was estimated that the landfill, which began operations on 1 April 1999, will last until 2045. The Ministry of Sustainability and the Environment states that, at current waste generation rates, the landfill will run out of space by around 2035. The Ministry of the Environment and Water Resources, along with the National Environment Agency which manages the landfill, hopes this deadline will be extended through various waste minimisation and resource conservation initiatives.

Semakau Landfill is filled mainly with ash produced by Singapore's four incineration plants, which incinerate the country's waste, shipped there in a covered barge (to prevent the ash from getting blown into the air) every night. Contrary to popular belief that Semakau Landfill would be another dirty and smelly landfill, the care put into the design and operational work at the landfill has ensured that the site is clean, free of smell and scenic. During construction, silt screens were installed to ensure that the corals were not affected during the reclamation works. The landfill is lined with an impermeable membrane, and clay and any leachate produced is processed at a leachate treatment plant. Regular water testing is carried out to ensure the integrity of the impermeable liners.

A new REMEX Minerals facility at Tuas began operations in July 2015, recovering tens of thousands of tonnes of metal from the remains of incinerated rubbish using magnetic and eddy separators. This reduces the weight of incinerated rubbish by around 10%, hence benefiting the landfill that may run out of space in 2035.

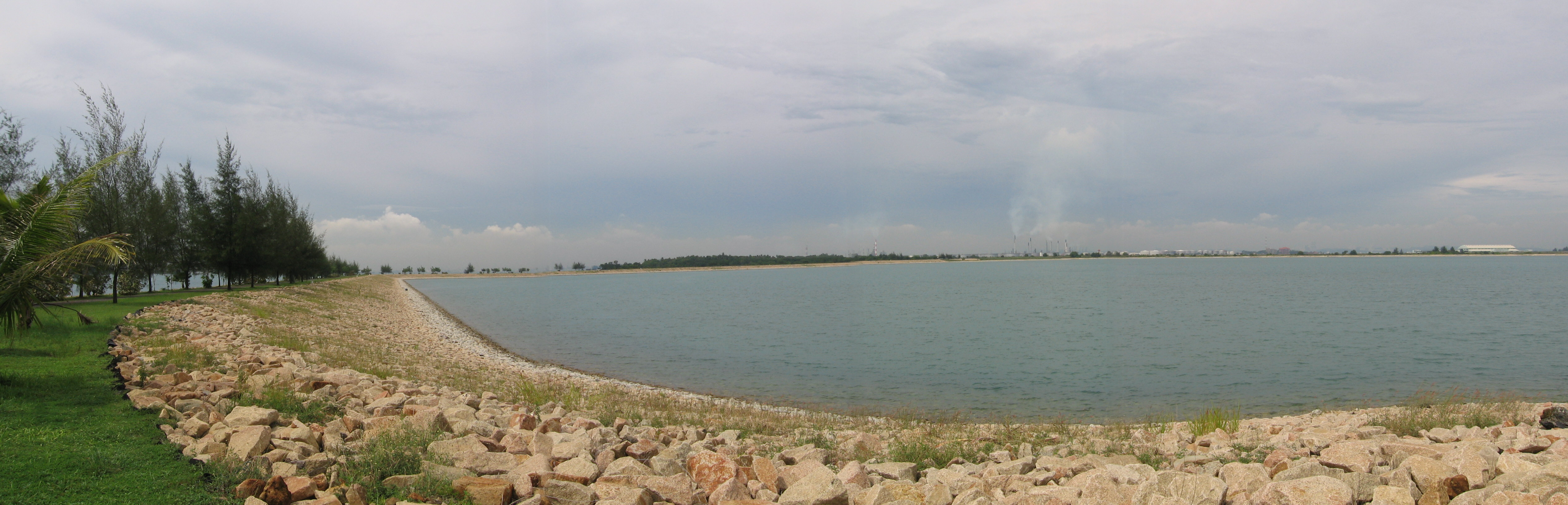
Panoramic view of Phase 2 wet cell of the Semakau Landfill from the western rock bund.

== Flora and fauna ==
Terrestrial flora and fauna

The terrestrial flora and fauna of the (natural) island has not been fully surveyed. At least 5 species of amphibians, 12 species of reptiles and 6 species mammals have been recorded on the island.

Marine flora and fauna

The coral reefs around Pulau Semakau have been monitored since the late 1980s to 2001, by the National University of Singapore, and from 2005 to the present by the "Reef Friends" programme, a joint project between the National Biodiversity Centre, National Parks Board, and the Blue Water Volunteers. Results of the surveys can be found at the Coral Reefs of Singapore and Blue Water Volunteers webpages.

The intertidal areas

A survey of the coastal and inter-tidal areas of the island in 2005 revealed four plants listed as endangered in Singapore, including the Seashore Bat Lily (Tacca leontopetaloides) which so far has only been recorded in one area of Singapore: Pulau Semakau. Semakau also has vast stretches of Tape seagrass (Enhalus acoroides) which is considered rare and vulnerable in Singapore. Semakau is also the only known location in Singapore of the seagrass Syringodium isoetifolium. The seagrass meadow is being monitored by Team Seagrass which was started in 2007.

The mangroves

The construction of the perimeter bund of the Landfill affected mangroves on the eastern side of the island. The developers replanted two plots of mangroves totaling 136,000 square metres, just outside the perimeter bund. The two plots are doing well, indicating that there has been no seepage through the liners. Another design feature is the built-in channels that allow the flow of seawater into non-active cells, keeping the water fresh at all times.

Today, after years of operation, the replanted mangrove, and remaining natural habitats on the island are doing well. Even the closed cells, topped up with soil, are flourishing. Birds can be seen in the air and on the open landscape, fishes swim in and out of the lagoons, and marine life continues to thrive in the mangrove mudflats and the western shorelines of Pulau Semakau.

== Ecological projects ==
=== Coral nursery ===
A coral nursery was set up beside Pulau Semakau on 31 July 2007 to enhance hard coral cover and diversity in Singapore. This is a collaborative effort between the National Biodiversity Centre, National Parks Board, Keppel Corporation, National University of Singapore and the National Environment Agency.

Suitable candidate species for coral culture are collected from existing reefs at Pulau Semakau as well as from other reefs in Singapore. The naturally occurring collected larvae, nubbins and fragments would be grown to sufficient sizes in the field nursery until they can be transplanted to recipient coral reefs for restoration or enhancement purposes. This is probably the first coral nursery in the region that utilises such "corals of opportunity".

The latest report on the status of the coral nursery can be viewed here.

=== Seagrass monitoring ===
The National Parks Board, National Biodiversity Centre, TeamSeagrass and volunteers from the public regularly conduct surveys and monitoring of the seagrasses found in Singapore in the inter-tidal areas such as Chek Jawa and Labrador Nature Reserve. The seagrass meadow at Pulau Semakau is one of the monitoring sites. These surveys are part of Seagrass-Watch, a global seagrass assessment and monitoring programme spanning 18 countries with more than 200 monitoring sites worldwide. Non-destructive scientific surveying methods developed by Seagrass-Watch are adopted. Data gathered is then fed back to Seagrass-Watch Headquarters, which then analyses the trends and condition of seagrass habitats at the local, regional and global scale.

=== Survey on intertidal sponges ===
The National Parks Board, National Biodiversity Centre and the Tropical Marine Science Institute jointly launched a collaborative project to survey and identify the intertidal sponges around Singapore. The inter-tidal area of Pulau Semakau is one of the 24 locations. Although sponges are commonly found on our shores, they are poorly known due to the limited studies conducted.

The 1-year study yielded a total of 102 species of intertidal sponges. One species new to science, Suberites diversicolor, was described and a large number of 40 species of intertidal sponges were recorded for the first time in Singapore.

== Recreational activities ==
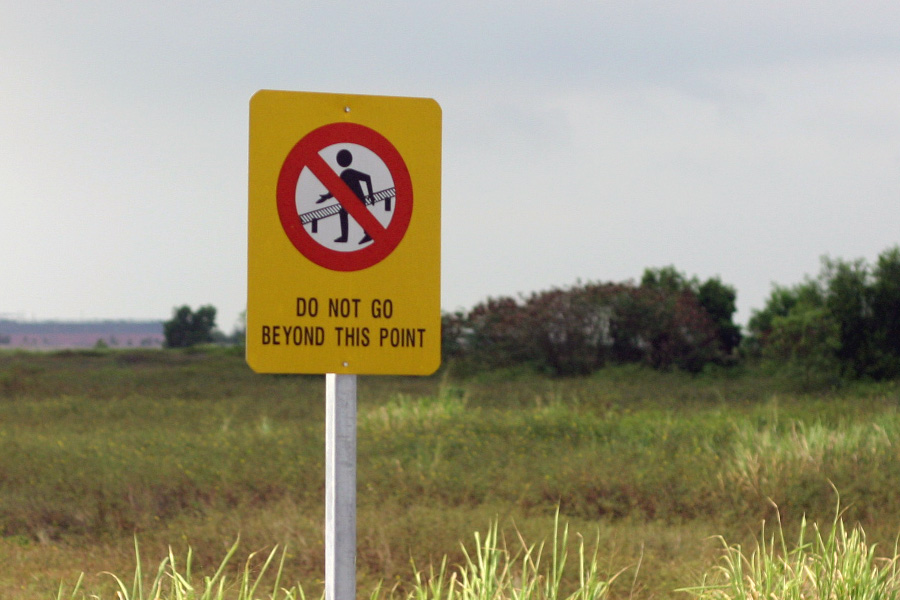
Semakau landfill scenery

The National Environment Agency on 16 July 2005 officially opened Semakau Landfill to the public for selected recreational activities. It was launched by the Minister for the Environment and Water Resources, Dr Yaacob Ibrahim, with 40 families of the former residents of Pulau Sakeng, one of the small islands from which Semakau Landfill was built, invited back to their former home as guests of the event. The residents had left over 10 years earlier. The opinions of various interest groups and organisations such as Nature Society of Singapore, Sport Fishing Association (Singapore) and Wild Singapore in using Semakau Landfill for recreational purposes were sought.

Visitors are to contact TASOS, Starfish Learning Journey, Nature Society, Sport Fishing Association, or the Raffles Museum of Biodiversity Research which conducts guided walks on the shores of Semakau for the public. All groups are led by a trained guide. This supervision is in place to protect the island's natural environment. Since 2010, the National Environment Agency took over management of guided walks on Semakau from Raffles Museum.

Further, facilities have been put in place, such as strategically located shelters, lightning arresters and lifebuoys, as well as directional signage and clear markings of no-access areas to keep visitors away from the operation areas.

Targeting interested groups in Singapore now have a recreational destination in the form of an open ash-filled landfill in the waters of southern Singapore, coexisting with a mix of mangrove, grassland and shoreline habitats.
