= Singapore (island) =

Main island of the Republic of Singapore

Coordinates: 1°22′N 103°48′E

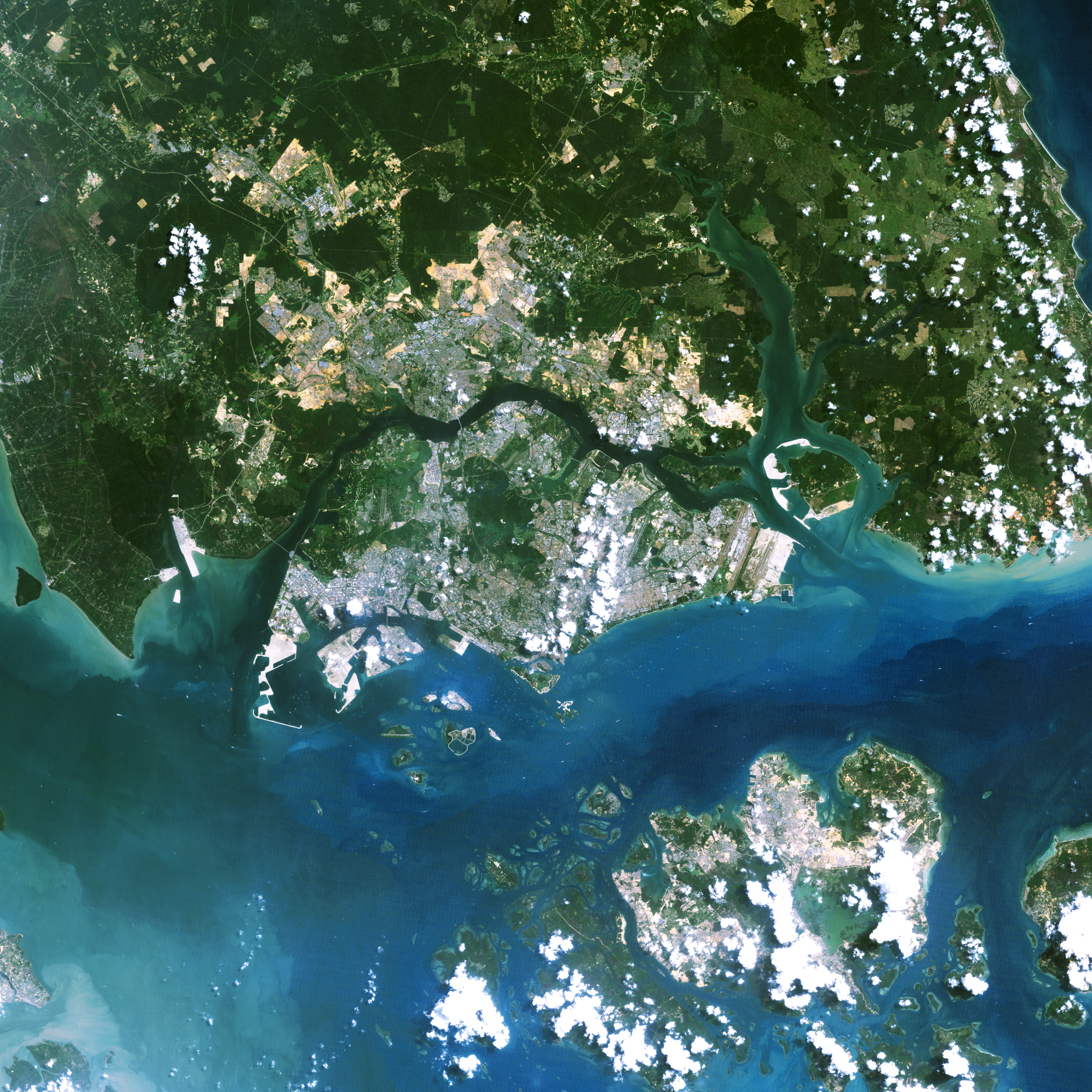
- Satellite image of Singapore and its surrounding areas in 2010
- Interactive map of Singapore

Geography
- Location: Southeast Asia
- Archipelago: Malay Archipelago
- Adjacent to: Singapore Strait; South China Sea; Straits of Malacca; Straits of Johor
- Area: 730 km^{2} (280 sq mi)
- Highest point: Bukit Timah Hill — 163.63 metres (536.8 ft)

Administration
- Singapore

Demographics
- Population: approx. 6,000,000 (2026)
- Pop. density: 8,000/km^{2} (21000/sq mi)
- Ethnic groups: Singaporeans (Predominantly Chinese, Malay, Indian and Eurasian)

Singapore (Note: Pulau Ujong (Malay) ڤولاو اوجوڠ (Jawi Malay) 新加坡岛 (Simplified Chinese) 新加坡島 (Traditional Chinese) உஜோங் தீவு (Tamil) Pedra Draku (Kristang)) is the main constituent island of the sovereign island country and city-state of the Republic of Singapore. It is located at the southern tip of the Malay Peninsula, between the Straits of Malacca and the South China Sea. The Singapore Strait lies to the south, while the Johor Strait lies to the north.

The island forms the bulk of the country in terms of area, population, and prominence since areas situated on the country's smaller islands consist of military or industrial areas, except for Sentosa and Ubin Islands. As of the mid-2020s, Singapore's population stood over six million, and the mainland has a land area of approximately 730 square kilometres (280 sq mi).

== Etymology ==
Temasek was the early recorded name of a settlement on the site of modern Singapore, although the island itself was not specifically defined. A 3rd-century Chinese reference to 蒲羅中 (pinyin: Pú Luó Zhōng) corresponds to the local name Pulau Ujong (lit. 'Island at the End' in Malay).

Travellers and merchants from around Asia arriving at the Singapore Strait to the South China Sea would have to pass by the island, hence the name Pulau Ujong. Similarly, Orang Laut tribes called Singapore by this name. Ujong Tanah (lit. "Land at the Furthest") or its variants were also used in European sources as a name for Singapore.

The Kristang name for the island, Pedra Draku (lit. "Rock of Dragons" or "Dragonsrock"), comes from the Dragon's Tail Peninsula found in older maps of the world, identified as the former sub-continent of Sundaland that the island of Singapore now sits on top of. The name Pedra Draku thus also has supposed parallels with the Dragon's Teeth Gate or Long Ya Men (Chinese: 龍牙門) that once stood at the front of Keppel Harbour, and also with the Malay name Pulau Ujong, identifying Singapore as the island at the end of the Dragon's Tail Peninsula.

== Legend ==
According to the mythical third-century book Record of Foreign Countries during the Eastern Wu Period (呉時外國傳), the island was inhabited by cannibals with five- to six-inch tails, which may have had racial connotations and provokes skepticism.

== Geography ==
On a straight line, the island measures approximately 55 kilometres (34 mi) from east to west and 28 kilometres (17 mi) from north to south, with 201 kilometres (125 mi) of coastline. The highest point of Singapore is Bukit Timah Hill, which is made up of igneous rock and granite and is 163.63 metres (536.8 ft) high. Hills and valleys of sedimentary rock dominate the northwest, while the eastern region consists of sandy and flatter land.

Since 1822, there have been land reclamation works, first by the British, who then controlled the island as a colony. Since independence, the contemporary government of Singapore has continued to increase the size of the island, having increased the area of the main island from 580 km^{2} (224 sq mi) in the 1960s to 710 km^{2} (274 sq mi) today. A further 200 km^{2} (77 sq mi) of land is also expected to be added to the main island.

=== Extreme points ===
The northernmost of Singapore is Sembawang. The westernmost and southernmost points are at Tuas. The easternmost is Changi Bay.
