= North-Eastern Islands =

- Planning Area
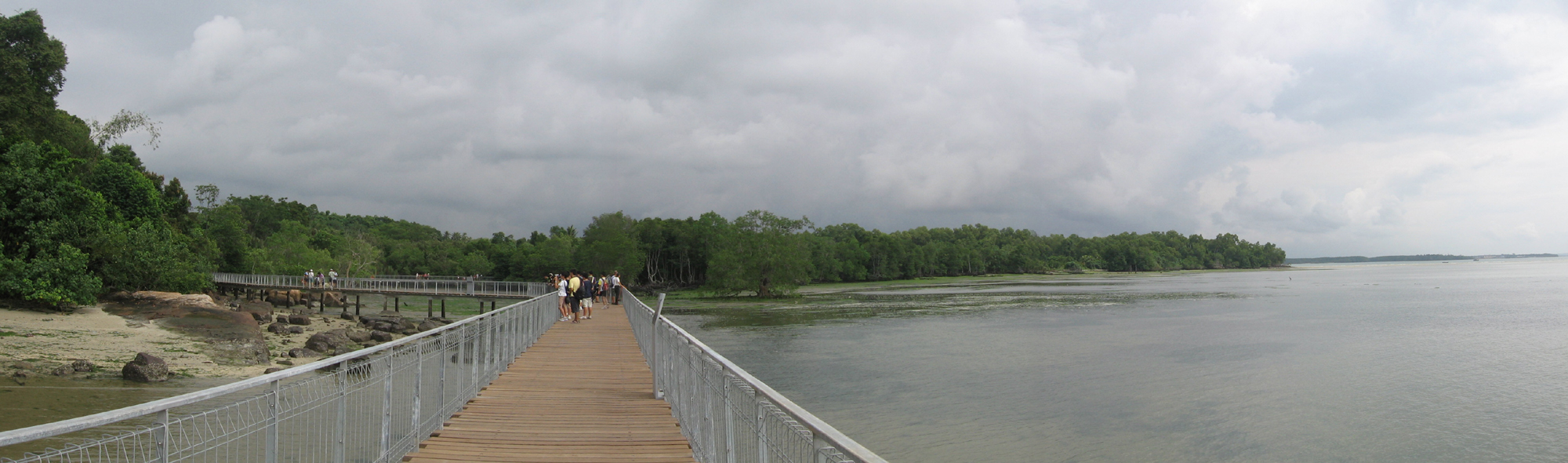
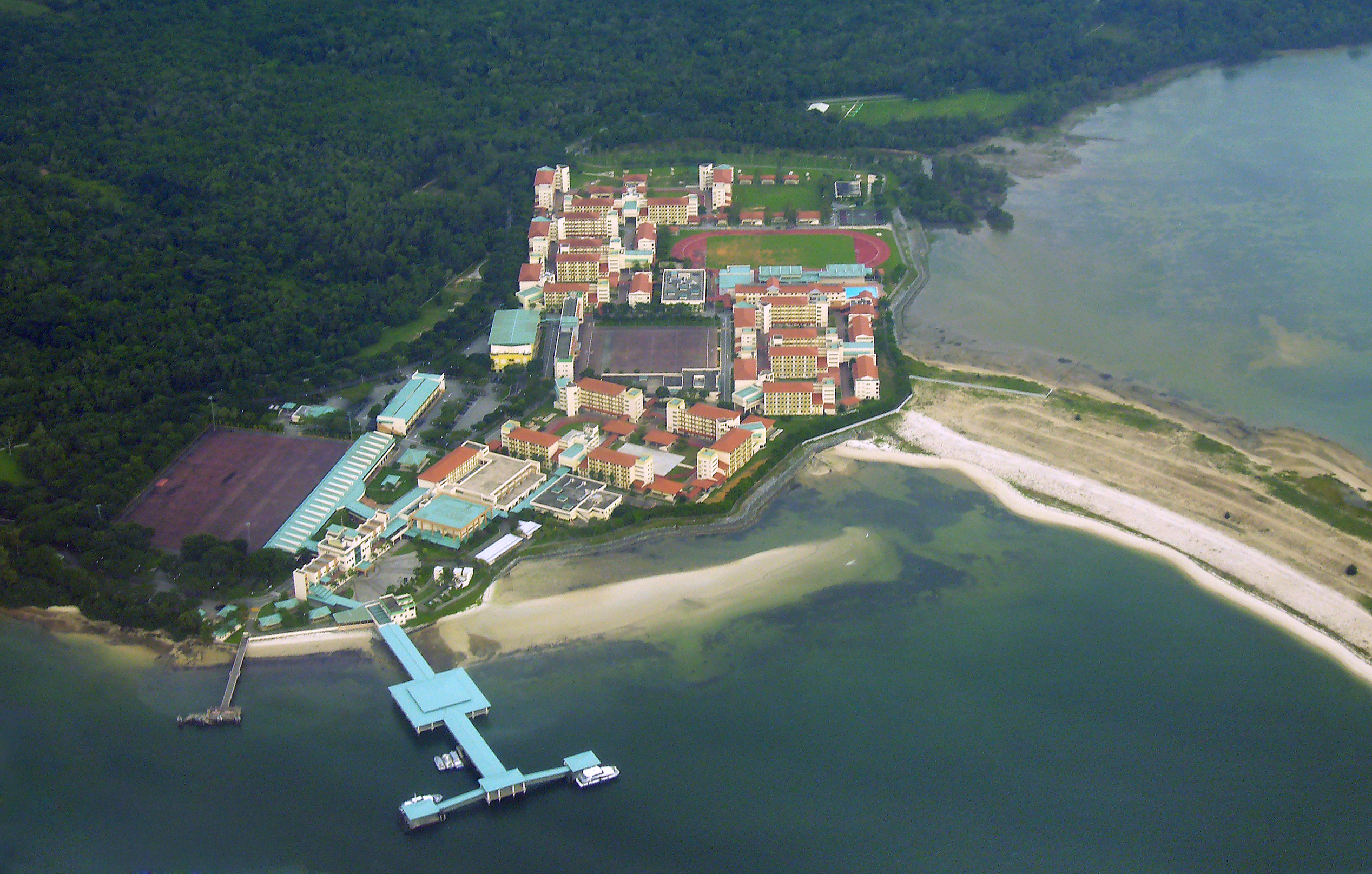
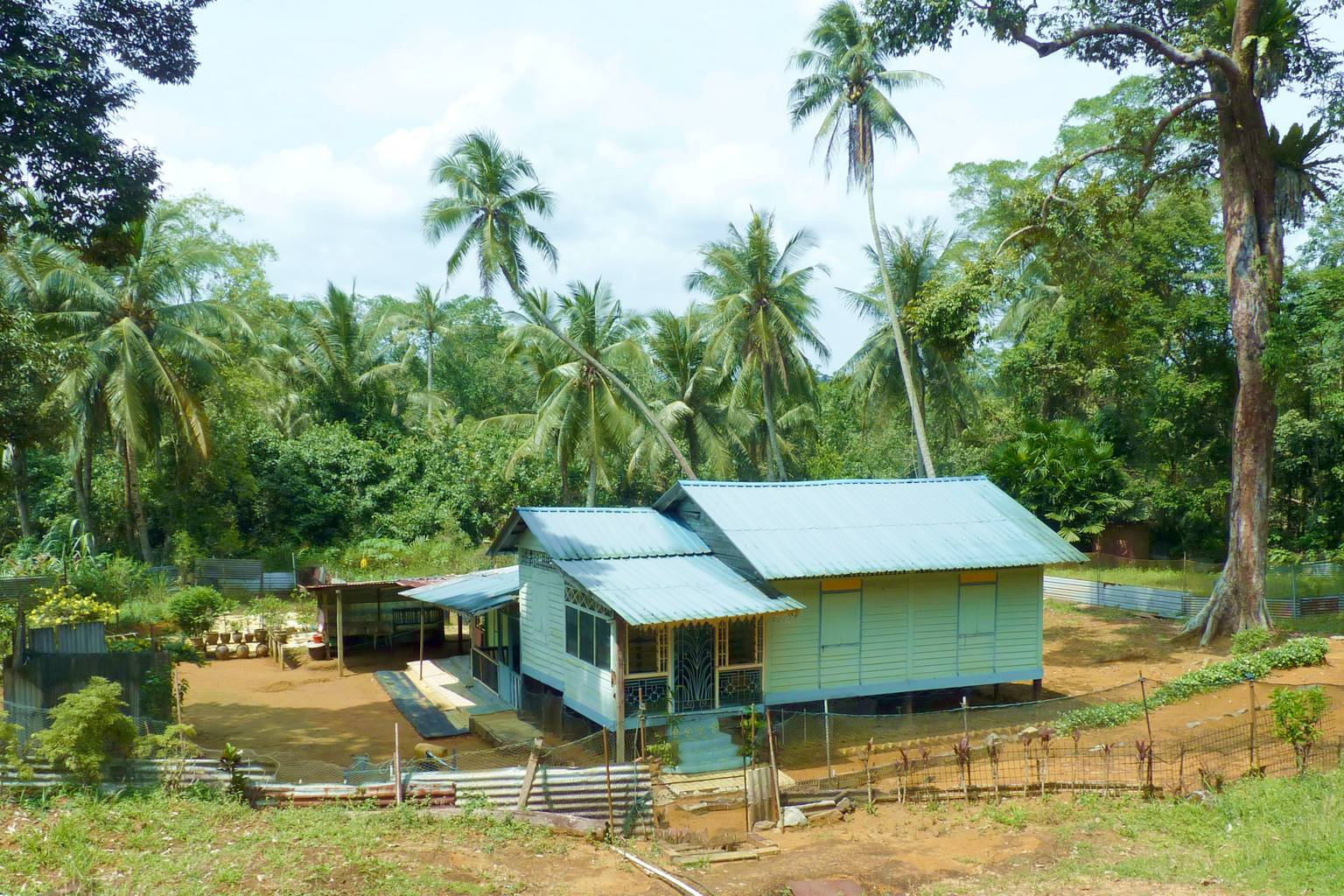
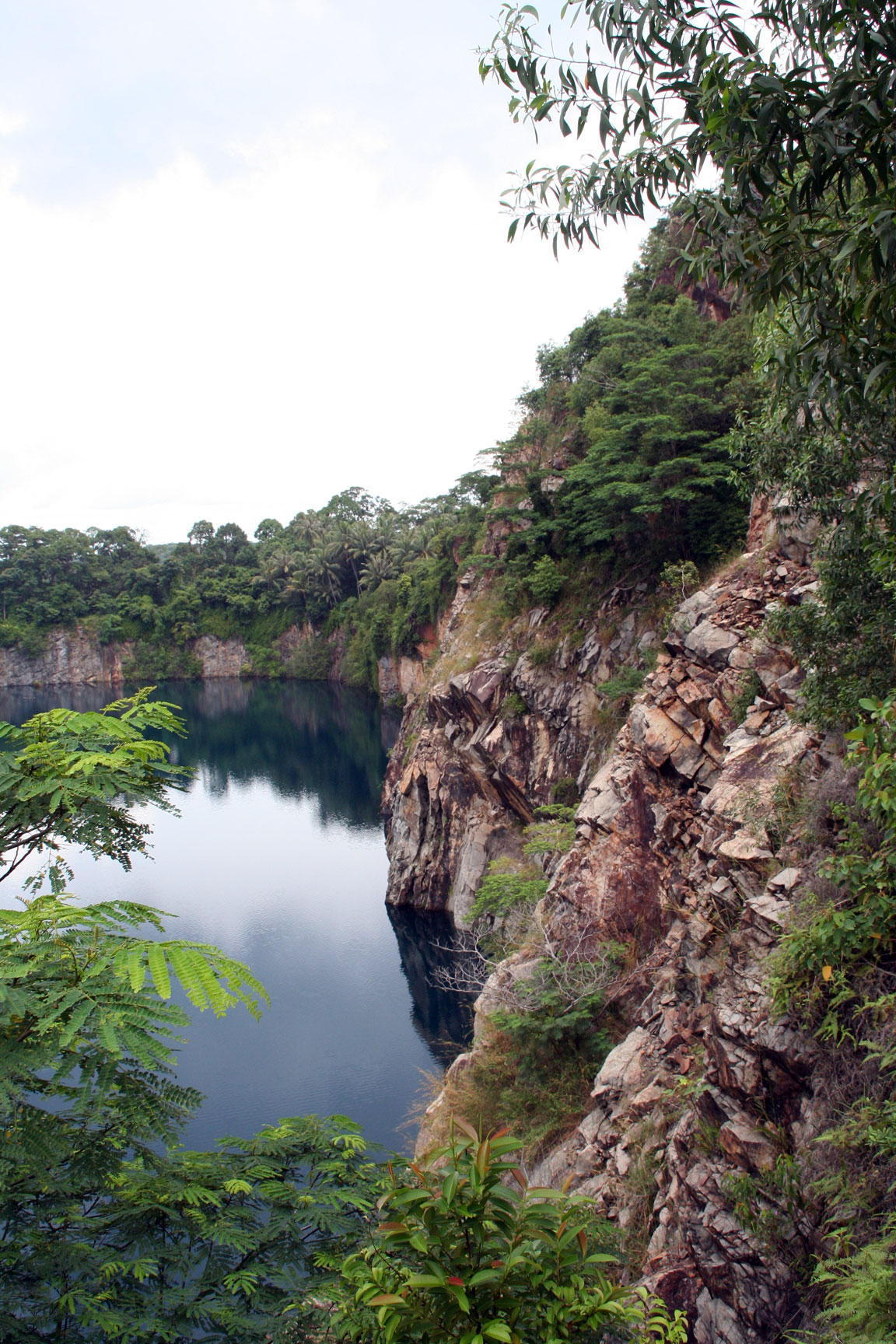
- From top left to right: Panorama of Chek Jawa, BMT training centre on Pulau Tekong, Huts in Pulau Ubin, Quarry in Pulau Ubin

- Location of the North-Eastern Islands in Singapore

- Location of North-Eastern Islands within Singapore
- Coordinates: 1°24′52.9″N 104°00′20.7″E
- Country: Singapore
- Region: North-East Region
- CDC: North East CDC
- Town councils: Pasir Ris–Changi Town Council
- Constituency: Pasir Ris–Changi GRC

Government
  - Mayor: North East CDC: Baey Yam Keng
  - Member of Parliament: Pasir Ris–Changi GRC: Valerie Lee

Area
  - Total: 67.3 km^{2} (26.0 sq mi)

Population (2026)
  - Total: 30
  - Density: 0.45/km^{2} (1.2/sq mi)

The North-Eastern Islands are a planning area and group of islands located within the North-East Region of Singapore. The cluster is made up of three islands, namely Pulau Tekong, Pulau Tekong Kechil and Pulau Ubin. Pulau Tekong and Pulau Tekong Kechil were formerly home to 10 villages while Pulau Ubin was home to a number of granite quarries. At present, Pulau Tekong houses the Singapore Armed Forces Basic Military Training Centre while Pulau Ubin is one of the last areas in Singapore that has been preserved from urban development, concrete buildings and tarmac roads.

The North-Eastern Islands share maritime boundaries with Changi, Pasir Ris and Punggol. The entire planning area is situated on the Straits of Johor.

== History ==
=== Tekong Islands ===
The islands were first inhabited by the Malays in the 1850s and by 1957, the population of the islands reached its peak at 4,169 residents, with 10 kampongs (villages) with predominantly Chinese residents. The islanders were all resettled onto the mainland by the 1980s due to Singapore's urbanisation and land reclamation works were carried out by the government to merge Pulau Tekong Kechil with the larger Pulau Tekong.

=== Pulau Ubin ===
In the 1880s, a number of Malays led by Endut Senin, from the Kallang River were said to have moved to the island that began the thriving Malay community on the island. During the 1950s and 1970s, there were 2,000 residents living on the island and the island had its own schools. With a student population that once numbered 400, enrollment fell as Singapore developed and many islanders resettled onto the mainland. The school closed in 1985, and was demolished on 2 April 2000. There was also a private Malay school around 1956 at Kampung Melayu, which closed in the late 1970s.

Since the British founding of Singapore, the island has been known for its granite. The numerous granite quarries on the island supply the local construction industry. The granite outcrops are particularly spectacular from the sea because their grooves and fluted sides create furrows and ridges on each granite rock slab. These features are captured in John Turnbull Thomson's 1850 painting — Grooved stones on Pulo Ubin near Singapore. In the 1970s as the granite quarries closed down and jobs dwindled, residents began leaving.

== See also ==
- Pulau Sejahat
