= Pulau Ubin Recreation Area =

Park in Pulau Ubin, Singapore

Coordinates: 1.4087°N 103.9655°E

Pulau Ubin Recreation Area is a site of about 700 hectares within the 1,020-hectare Pulau Ubin. The area is managed under National Parks Board(NParks)'s charge, along with Chek Jawa Wetlands

== History ==
New towns were planned for development in Pulau Ubin under Urban Redevelopment Authority(URA)'s Concept Plan 1991. The plan was later scrapped under Concept Plan 2001 to preserve the rustic nature and rich heritage of the island. The idea of recreational areas then replaced the initial plans to become the Pulau Ubin Recreational Area we see today.

== Activities ==
The recreational amenities in the area include cycling, hiking, fishing and nature appreciation tours. Camping sites are available for overnight stays. The Jelutong Campsite covers an area of 7.5 hectares. It opened in December 2005 and is the largest campsite in the island.
