= Rosli =

Rosli is both a unisex given name and a surname of Malay and Indonesian origin.

Notable people with the given name include:

- TRT Tan Rosli Thom

Famous Writer

- Rosli Dhobi (1932–1950), Malaysian rebel
- Rosli Liman (born 1969), Bruneian footballer
- Roslï Näf (1911–1996), Swiss nurse
- Rosli Ahmat (1970–2002), Singaporean executed armed robber and murderer
- Rosli Yassin (born 1960), Singaporean convicted killer

Notable people with the surname or patronymic include:

- Arnold Rösli (1879-?), Swiss sports shooter
- Arulraj Rosli (1940–2016), Malaysian cyclist
- Che Rosli (born 1951), Malaysian politician
- Durratun Nashihin Rosli (born 1988), Malaysian rhythmic gymnast
- Faisal Rosli (born 1991), Malaysian footballer
- Faris Shah Rosli (born 1995), Malaysian footballer
- Khairul Izuan Rosli (born 1991), Malaysian footballer
- Ramdan Rosli (born 1996), Malaysian motorcycle racer

Notable people with the alias include:

- Rosli (alias), alias of Singaporean criminal Mohamed Yasin Hussin
