= Ubin–Khatib Important Bird Area =

Singaporean conservation area

Coordinates: 01°25′N 103°58′E

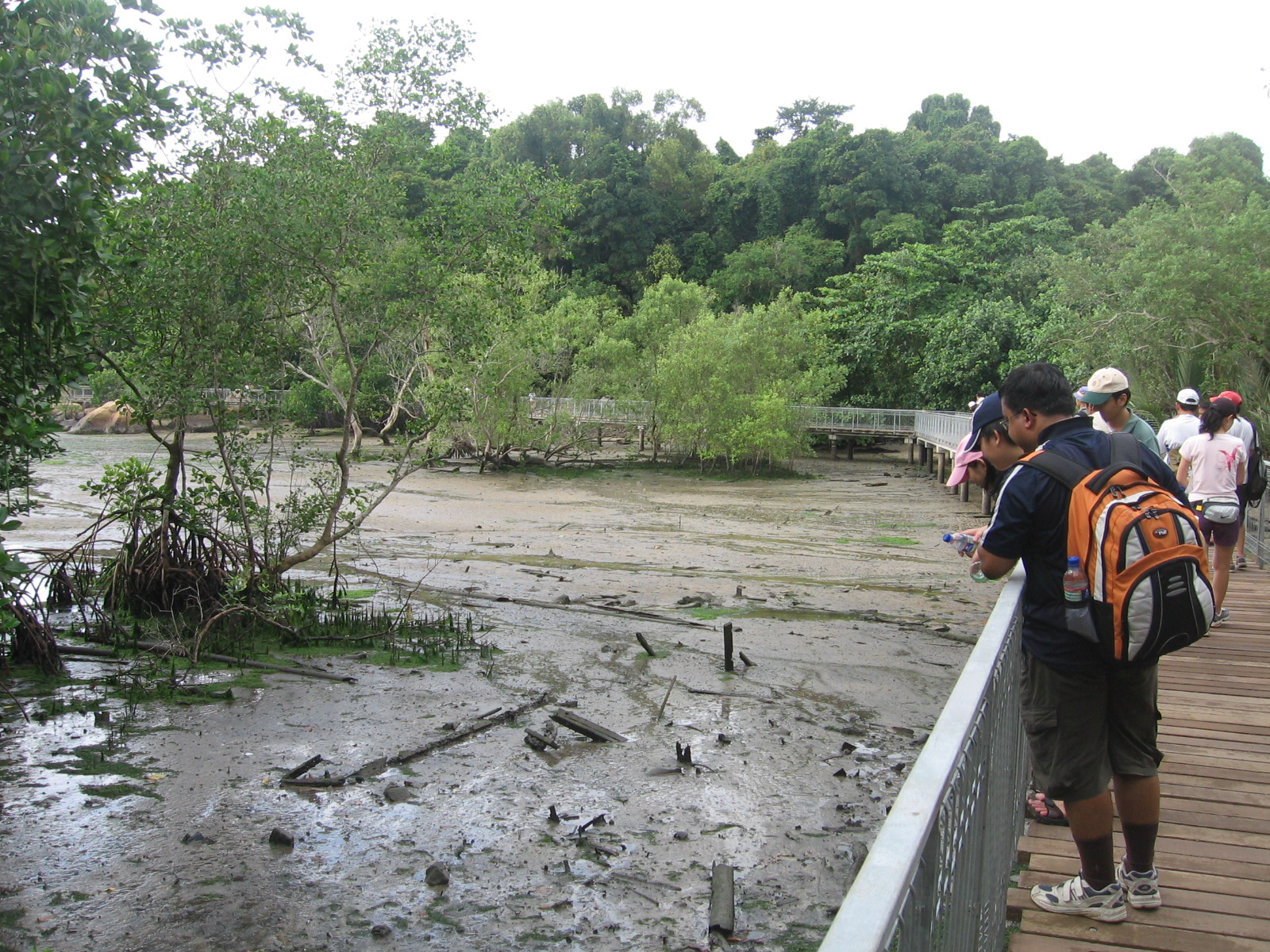
Mangrove boardwalk at Chek Jawa, at the eastern end of Ubin Island

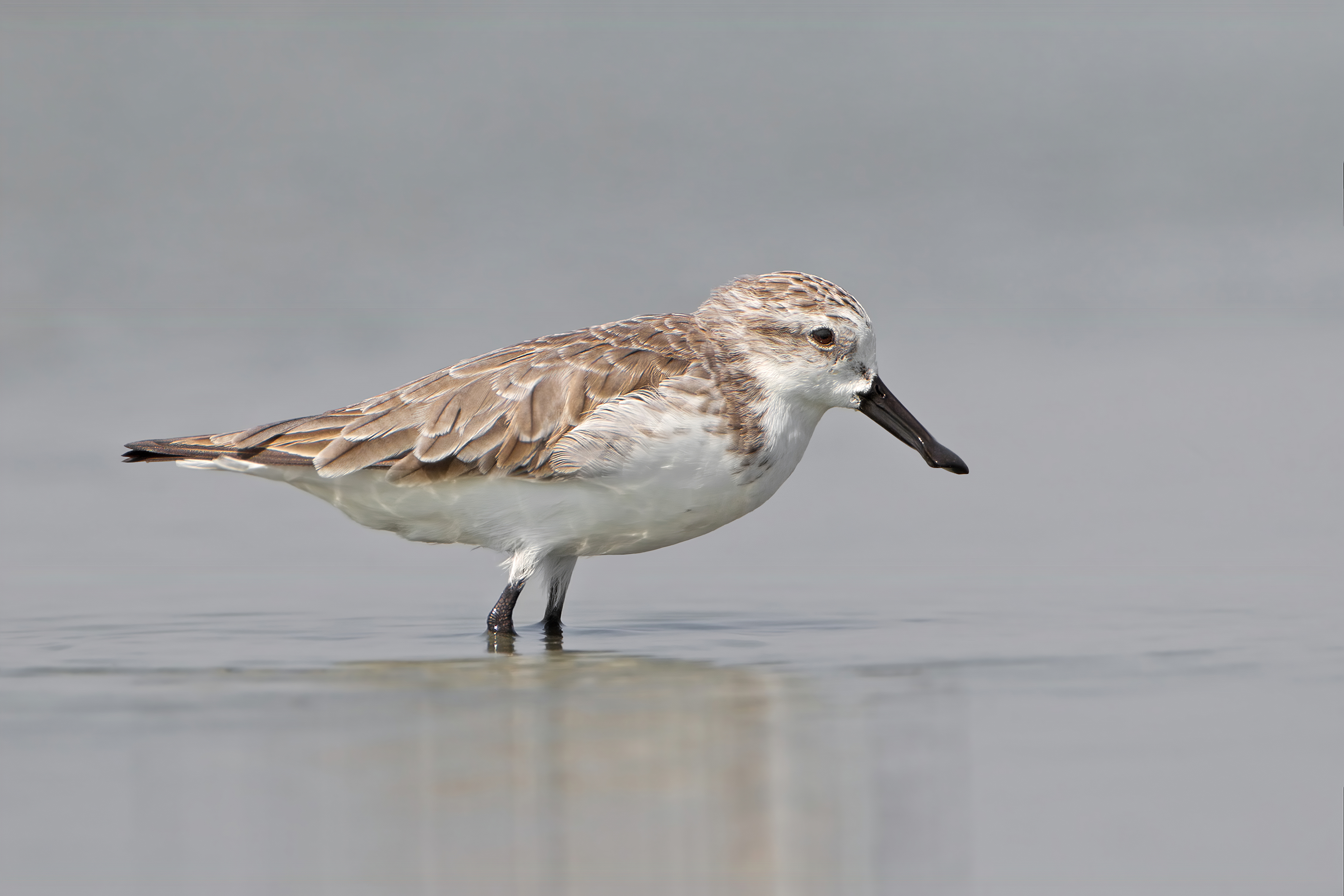
Critically endangered Spoon-billed Sandpipers have been recorded in the IBA

The Ubin–Khatib Important Bird Area, also known as the North-East Conservation Area, is an 8940 ha tract of largely undeveloped land in north-eastern Singapore on the border with the Malaysian state of Johor. It encompasses the island of Ubin and much of the islands of Tekong and Tekong Kechil, as well as a coastal strip of the main island, including the Lower Seletar Reservoir, with the intervening coastal waters, seagrass beds, mangroves and intertidal mudflats.

== Birds ==
The site has been identified as an Important Bird Area (IBA) by BirdLife International because it supports significant numbers of visiting and resident birds, some of which are threatened. These include vulnerable Chinese egrets, greater spotted eagles and straw-headed bulbuls, endangered Nordmann's greenshanks and critically endangered spoon-billed sandpipers, as well as greater crested terns.
