= Remember Chek Jawa =

2007 documentary film

Remember Chek Jawa is a 47-minute documentary made on digital video by freelance cinematographer Eric Lin Youwei. It documents a biodiversity survey conducted in 2001, by a small group of volunteer conservationists, headed by botanist Joseph Lai, months before the Singapore government's reclamation project at Chek Jawa, Pulau Ubin. Chek Jawa is an inter-tidal area of about 1 square kilometre which supports a vast amount of plant and animal lives encompassing six ecosystems.

The volunteers' efforts were rewarded when the government agreed, in December 2001, to defer use of the Chek Jawa land for the next ten years.

The documentary is available as a DVD under Objectifs Films, available in the libraries under the National Library Board, Singapore.
