= Ketam Mountain Bike Park =

Mountain bike trail in Pulau Ubin, Singapore

- Location within Singapore
- Location: Pulau Ubin, Singapore
- Coordinates: 1°24′41.3″N 103°56′51.9″E
- Area: 45 hectares (450,000 m^{2})
- Opened: 17 May 2008

Ketam Mountain Bike Park is a mountain bike trail located in Pulau Ubin, Singapore.

== Background ==
=== Location ===
The bike park is located around the fringe of a quarry in Pulau Ubin that was previously not occupied for any usage purpose. Ketam Quarry underwent a major rehabilitation project by National Parks Board (NParks), which transformed it into a green space fit for biking activities. The park includes the German Girl Shrine.

=== Bike trails design ===
The design of the mountain bike tracks had been carefully chosen and constructed with regard to the International Mountain Bicycling Association (IMBA) standards. The Singapore Amateur Cycling Association (SACA) was engaged as well, to provide consultation and expertise.

The mountain bike trail at the park is designed such that it can be used by leisure cyclists and competitive cyclists alike.

== Opening ==
It was opened to public on 17 May 2008. Entry to the bike park is free of charge.

The 45-hectare park consists of 10 kilometres long of mountain bike trails. It is the first such park in Singapore that meets the international standards for mountain biking competitions. Apart from international standard competitions, Ketam Mountain Bike Park also allows recreational cycling.

=== IMBA ratings ===
Ketam Mountain Bike Park currently consists of tracks with the 3 out of 5 IMBA ratings, to cater to cyclists of different skill levels. Trails with the Blue Square code consist of steep slopes as well as narrow tracks with poor traction. These trails are most suitable for beginners. The Black Diamond trails cater more for the middle-skilled cyclists with long step climbs, drop-offs and challenging obstacles. The most challenging trails of all is those coded as Double Black Diamond. These trails have a variety of extra steep climbs and drop-offs, sharp corners and tricky obstacles.

=== Skills park ===
Cyclists get to experiment with the obstacles in these parks and take their skills to the next level. The Dirt Skills Park is designed as a circuit with compact tracks and appeal to a wider genre of cyclists. In Freeride Skills Park, one can find the course strewn with natural and man-made obstacles which are technically challenging.

=== Facilities ===
Shelters are strategically located along the tracks. These shelters double as resting points for tired cyclists. To guide cyclists around the island, signs are positioned at the key locations such as the intersection points.
