= Fo Shan Ting Da Bo Gong Temple =

Temple in Singapore

Coordinates: 1.4031°N 103.9678°E

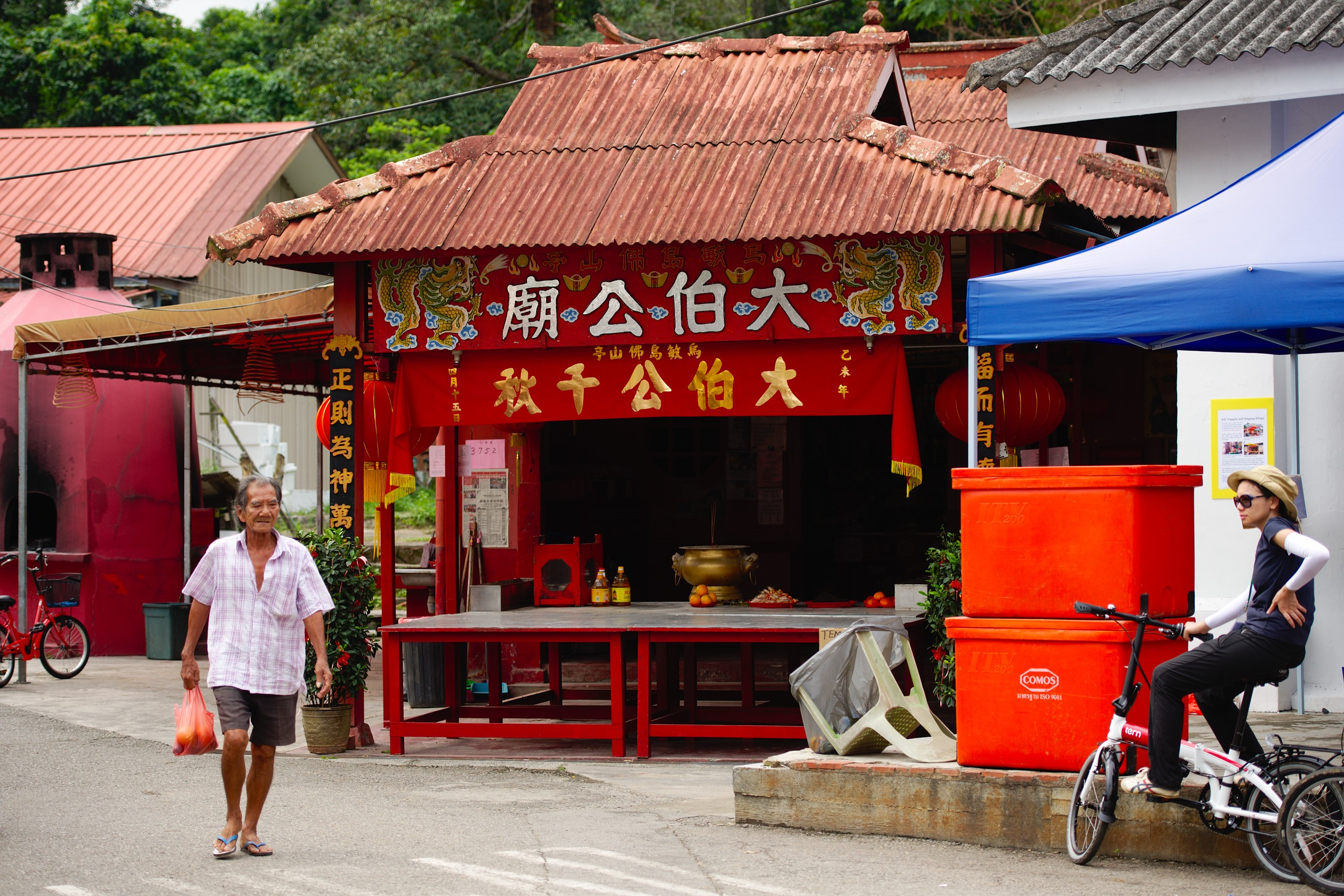
Fo Shan Teng Tua Pek Kong Temple

Fo Shan Ting Da Bo Gong Temple (Chinese: 佛山亭大伯公廟) is a Chinese temple in Singapore located in Pulau Ubin.

== History ==
The temple was founded in 1869. In 2010, the temple began a fundraising campaign in order to rebuild the temple.

The temple holds a six-day celebration to celebrate the birthday of Tua Pek Kong.

== News articles ==
- "When Gods walked on Ubin: Rebuilt temple marks birthday of resident deity". The Straits Times (online). 2019-05-27.
