= German Girl Shrine =

Religious place in Pulau Ubin, Singapore

Coordinates: 1.4092°N 103.9493°E

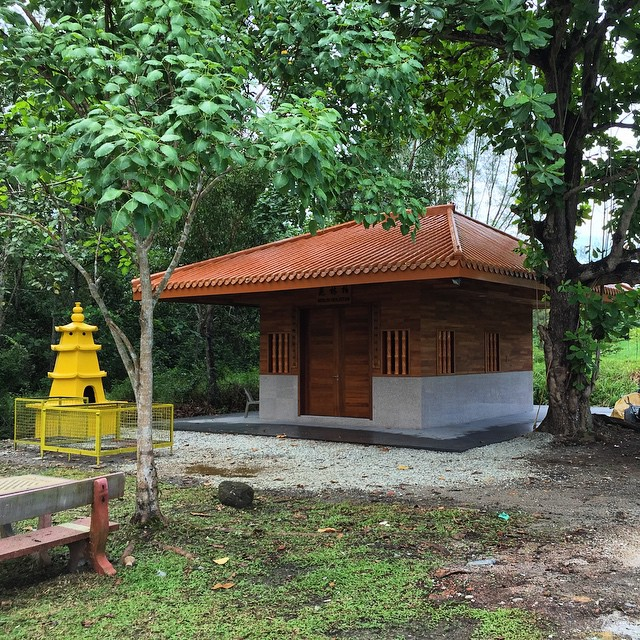
Exterior in April 2015

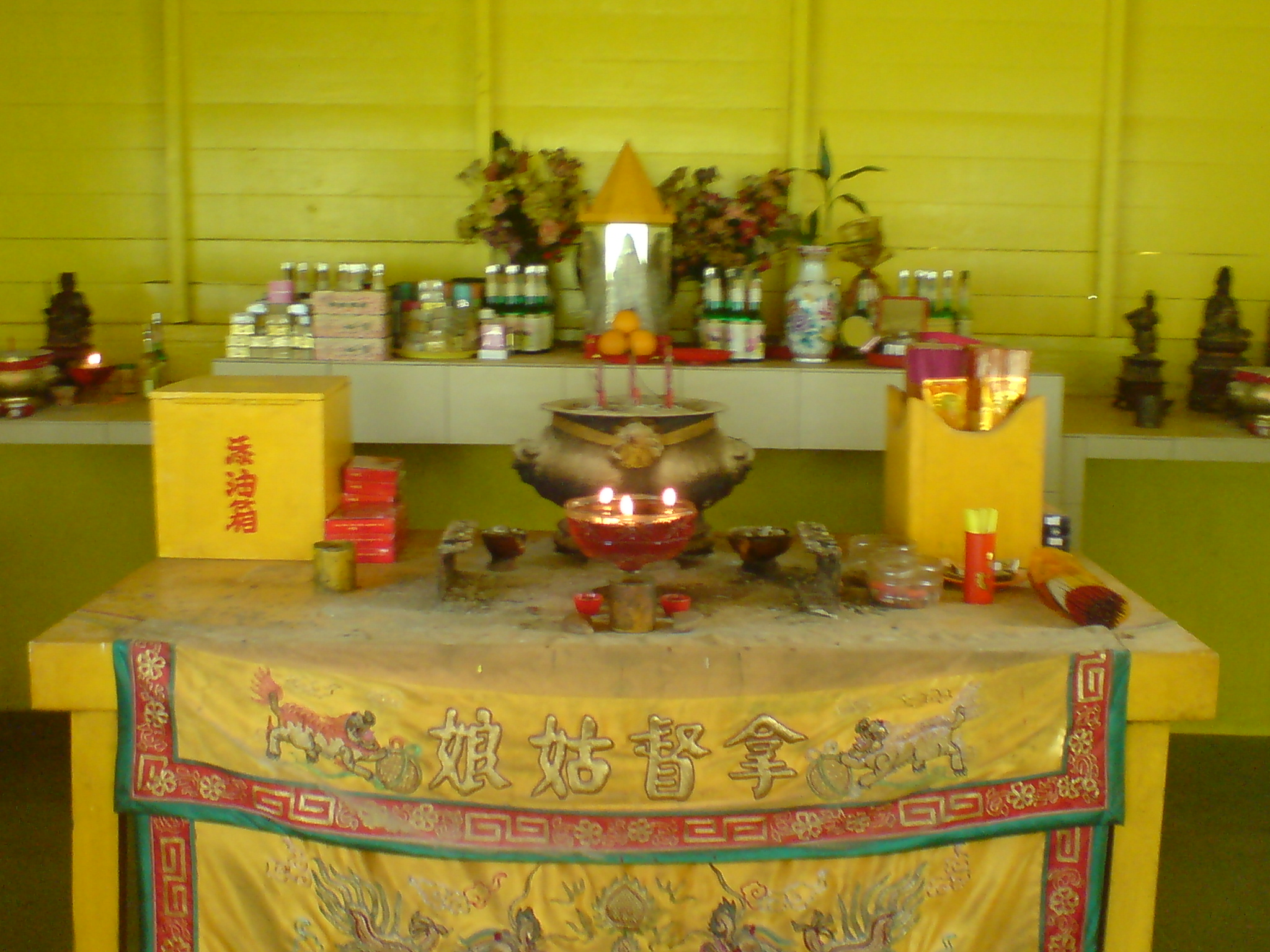
Interior in June 2007

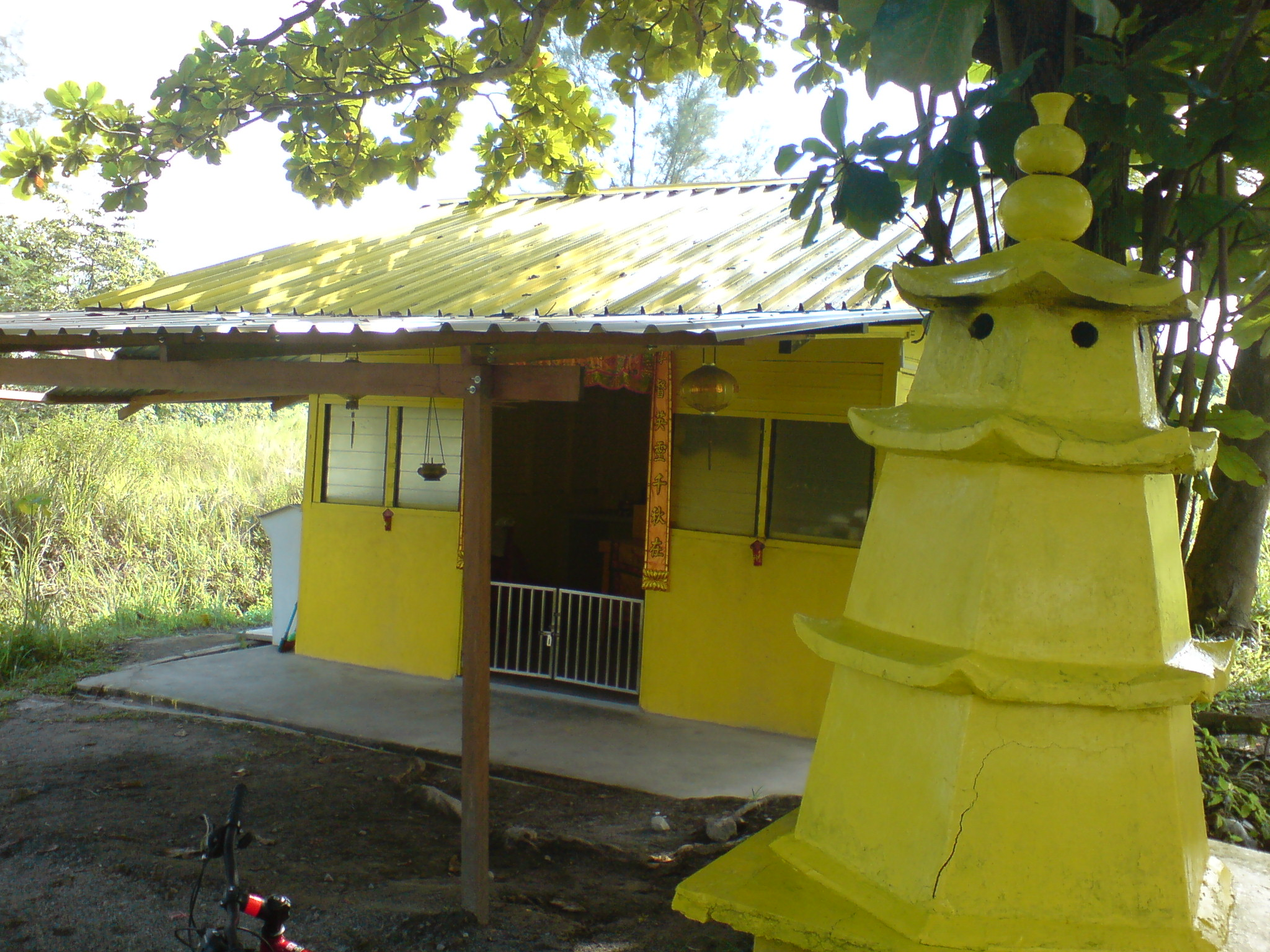
Exterior in June 2007

The German Girl Shrine is a shrine on the island of Pulau Ubin in Singapore. It marks the site of the burial of an unknown 18-year-old girl who died on the island in 1914 after falling from a cliff while fleeing from British forces who sought to detain a number of German nationals then resident on the island. Her body was recovered and interred in an urn on the site by Chinese workers, and a makeshift shrine structure was built. The site was visited frequently by gamblers who thought the spirit of the girl would bring them good luck. A permanent structure was erected in 1974 by a company carrying out quarrying on the island. Quarrying has since ceased, and the shrine is now within Ketam Mountain Bike Park. Visitors often leave offerings, including makeup and Barbie dolls, at the site.

== Background ==
In the 1910s, the island of Pulau Ubin in the British Crown Colony of Singapore was home to two German families (the Brandts and Muhlingans) who ran coffee plantations. The island was also a key source of granite used in the construction of buildings and infrastructure on the Singapore mainland and was home to a number of quarries. The outbreak of the First World War, in which Germany was in conflict with Britain, in July 1914 led the British to detain German nationals on security grounds. A British military force was sent to Pulau Ubin to detain the Germans but the 18-year-old daughter of one of the families fled from the British forces into a wooded area. A number of days later her body, covered by ants, was discovered by Boyanese plantation workers; the girl had died after falling down a cliff near to a quarry. The workers covered the body with sand, laid down flowers and lit incense before offering prayers for the girl, whose name is not known.

== Shrine ==
Chinese workers later recovered the body and buried the girl at the crest of a hill above the quarry. She was interred in an urn together with a crucifix (the girl was Roman Catholic) and a number of coins. A makeshift shrine was constructed over the grave which became associated with good luck. Gamblers from Singapore and the Malay peninsula visited the shrine to make offerings in the hope that the spirit of the German Girl would bless them with good fortune. In 1974 a quarrying company constructed a more permanent shrine, described as "a small yellow Chinese temple", on the site. It is believed that the girl's remains were exhumed at this time and her remains placed in an urn at the site.

Quarrying declined on the island from the 1970s, with the last site shutting in 1999. The number of residents dropped from around 2,000 to fewer than 100 and the island became a refuge for wildlife. The shrine, in the south-west of the island, is now located within Ketam Mountain Bike Park.

The German Girl Shrine continues to attract visitors who leave offerings of nail polish, perfume, makeup and Barbie dolls for the spirit of the girl. The shrine has been adorned with Christmas decorations. The shrine, which attracts an average of four to five visitors a week, was renovated in February 2015.

== Historical veracity of claims ==
According to original research by Dr William L. Gibson, an author and researcher based in Southeast Asia, there was no coffee plantation in operation in Pulau Ubin in 1914 during world war I. Likewise, there is no historical evidence to suggest that a German family was living on the island at that time. Gibson suggested that the shrine could have originated from the practice of Datuk Keramat, a type of Malay folk belief related to ancestor worship that was also co-opted and syncretised by Chinese immigrants with Chinese ancestral and nature worship to become the practice of Na Tuk Kong. The legend of ants in relation to the story of the German Girl could be due to the origin of the shrine as an ant hill or termite mounds that became the site of datuk keramat. It is not uncommon for ant hills to be sites of datu keramat worship, and the site may have been one of such before the subsequent evolution of the shrine's background story.

Gibson also conducted some research regarding the reporting of the shrine in media. The earliest photo in existence of the shrine building was from an article in the Malay newspaper Berita Minggu, now Berita Harian (Singapore), dated 1985 October 27, about the grave of a princess from Java that was located on a hill on Pulau Ubin. The article refers to the shrine as the likely location of the grave. The existence of this article seems to suggest that at that point in time, the German girl story was not the backstory, or at least not the only backstory for the shrine. In 1987 the story of the German girl appeared in media from the interviews of Pulau Ubin islander Chia Yeng Keng. In recent decades, the story became popularized in various articles and books such as Chua Ee Kiam's Pulau Ubin: Ours to Treasure (2000), Jonathan Lim’s Between Gods and Ghosts (2005) and Neil Humphreys' Final Notes from a Great Island (2006).
