= 1972 Pulau Ubin murder =

1972 murder in Pulau Ubin, SIngapore

Poon Sai Im
- Born: Poon Sai Im c. 1914; Singapore, Straits Settlements
- Died: 22 April 1972 (aged 57–58); Pulau Ubin, Singapore
- Cause of death: Fatal rib fractures
- Known for: Murder victim
- Spouse: Unnamed husband (died before 1972)

On 22 April 1972, Poon Sai Im (潘世英 Pān Shìyīng), a 58-year-old provisions shop owner who lived on the island of Pulau Ubin, Singapore, was robbed and killed by two men, who had initially intended to rob her. When one of Poon's attackers searched for valuables, the other attacker, 19-year-old Mohamed Yasin bin Hussin, alias Rosli, raped the victim. Prior to raping the victim, Yasin sat on the victim, resulting in rib fractures leading to cardiac arrest and led to the victim's death. Both men were eventually arrested nine months after the case and tried for murder.

Yasin was initially found guilty of murder and subjected to the death sentence (the other man was convicted of and jailed for robbery), but before he could be executed, Yasin won his appeal to the Privy Council in London. He was subsequently taken to court to be tried for rape and consequently spent ten years in prison before his release in 1983. Yasin's case was a subject of debate and question in Singapore's criminal law regarding the definition of murder under Section 300(c) of the Penal Code, in which the offence of murder constitutes one's intentional causing of fatal injuries to a person despite having no intention to kill.

== Pulau Ubin murder ==
In early April 1972, Mohamed Yasin bin Hussin (born 1953), alias Rosli, then 19 years old, intended to rob Poon Sai Im, a 58-year-old shop owner on Pulau Ubin. Poon made her living selling provisions in a shophouse and her business was profitable.

Knowing that Poon was quite wealthy and kept a lot of money in her house, Yasin approached his friend and fellow labourer, 25-year-old Harun bin Ripin (Note: His name was also spelt as Hurun bin Ripin. A source reported his full name as Harun bin Ariffin.) (born 1946) to join him in the robbery. Harun initially neither agreed nor declined the request, but eventually on 22 April 1972, he agreed to go along with Yasin's plan. A third man, only known as Maarof, was initially also approached to join the both of them, but he declined, saying that he was not interested.

That night, Yasin and Harun rowed a sampan boat from Changi Point Jetty to Pulau Ubin, and both arrived at the beach nearby Poon's house. After reaching the house, Yasin went to Poon's chicken pen where he disturbed the chickens, causing a commotion, which led to Poon leave her house. Upon the appearance of the woman, Yasin and Harun caught hold of Poon and covered her mouth to prevent her from shouting.

Two men forced Poon back into the house and pinned her down. Harun left Yasin to search for valuables while Yasin continued to restrain Poon. During the struggle, Poon’s trousers slipped down, exposing her lower body. Upon seeing this, the teenager attempted to rape her. While removing his trousers. Yasin sat on Poon’s chest and covered her mouth to prevent her from calling for help. After the assault, the 19-year-old Yasin noticed that Poon had become motionless and unresponsive.

Harun returned to Yasin with $40 in cash, 10 packets of cigarettes and a gold ring. Upon seeing Poon's motionless body, he asked Yasin what had happened. Yasin revealed that he had raped Poon and they then realised Poon was unresponsive. They took Poon's body to the beach and attempted to revive Poon by splashing seawater on her face without success. They then boarded their sampan with Poon's body and threw her body overboard in the sea before they returned to mainland Singapore.

== Discovery of the victim and cause of death ==
The next day, on 23 April 1972, Poon's youngest daughter Lim Ah Moi went to her mother's house and found that her mother was missing. She informed her boatman husband Ng Tan Tee, alias Tong San, about this and found her house ransacked. The couple then reported it to the police.

A day later, a fisherman fished out a semi-nude body of a woman and reported it to the police. The police managed to identify the deceased woman as the missing Poon. Initially, the police presumed that she may have accidentally drowned in the sea.

Poon's body was taken to Singapore General Hospital for an autopsy. Forensic pathologist and professor Chao Tzee Cheng performed the autopsy found that Poon was not drowned. He found nine fractures on the victim's ribs, which he ascertained as the cause of death as these fractures were sufficient to cause cardiac arrest and thus lead to death given her age and the bones' resulting fragility. These fractures were caused by compressions applied on her chest caused by Yasin sitting on her chest when he undressed. Chao also found bruises on her face and wrists, defensive injuries caused by Poon trying to defend herself against her attacker(s) and her being punched or hit by a blunt object. He also told police that the woman was sexually assaulted, as there were abrasions and injuries on her vaginal wall and bruises on her thighs, showing that someone used force to pry her thighs open and presumably raped her. These were presented in the forensic report which Chao submitted to the courts. Police investigations took place but there was no progress for the next nine months due to the lack of clues in the case.

== Yasin and Harun's murder trial ==
=== Arrest and legal proceedings ===
Nine months later, on 9 February 1973, when he was arrested for another crime, 26-year-old Harun surprised his police interrogators by confessing to them about his involvement in the then-unsolved Pulau Ubin robbery. He also named Yasin as his accomplice.

This confession led to Yasin's arrest the next day, and the two men were charged with the murder of Poon. They were tried together in the same trial in the High Court. Maarof was also arrested but was released as he was found to be not involved in the robbery or murder.

Initially, during their interrogations and pre-trial conferences, both Yasin and Harun admitted to their respective roles in the robbery and murder of Poon. However, as the men's trial started on 5 March 1974, the pair denied that they gave their statements voluntarily and they were being induced by the police interrogators to give them these statements as part of a deal to avoid the death penalty, and to face only charges of robbery and rape. Yasin even said he was forced to sign to acknowledge the statements under the threat that the police officers would physically assault him if he did not do so. Later, after a trial within a trial, the two judges hearing the case - Choor Singh and A. V. Winslow - ruled that these statements should be admitted as evidence.

After the prosecution presented its case, and after the pathologist Chao gave his evidence to the courts, both Yasin and Harun were told to give their defence. Yasin made an unsworn statement on the dock, claiming that he did not rape the victim despite what he had admitted to in his statements. He also stated he did not intend to cause death and only wanted to cover Poon's mouth to prevent her from shouting. On the other hand, Harun stated he only intended to steal from Poon and not to kill anyone. The lawyers of Yasin and Harun emphasized in their closing submissions that their clients only intended to commit theft and their lack of weapons showed that they had not planned violence. Harun's lawyer Nathan Isaac also raised the fact that his client was not aware of what Yasin did to the widow before her death. Yasin's lawyer G Raman also stated that there was no evidence to prove that the fatal rib fractures were caused intentionally by Yasin, or furthermore, had even been caused by Yasin.

In rebuttal, the prosecution, led by Deputy Public Prosecutor (DPP) Pala Krishnan argued that regardless of whether the two defendants were armed, as long as there was evidence to show that the pair's common intention was robbery and the injuries inflicted by Yasin upon Poon were sufficient in the ordinary cause of nature to cause death, then the two would be guilty of murder.

=== Sentences ===
On 15 March 1974, at the end of the trial, the two judges released their verdict, with Justice Winslow pronouncing the written verdict in court.

In their judgement, both Justices Winslow and Singh were satisfied that the fatal injury was intentionally inflicted upon the victim by Yasin, and such injury was sufficient in the ordinary cause of nature to cause death. They were also satisfied that the two men had shared a common intention to commit robbery by together luring Poon out of her house. They also noted the fact that while Harun was inside the other room looking for valuables, Yasin had raped Poon while restraining the woman during the robbery and Harun's absence, and so the two judges cannot rule out the theory that Yasin had caused the nine fatal rib fractures on Poon in furtherance of his intention to rape the elderly woman, leading to her death.

Aside from this, given the facts of the case, the judges found that Harun could not be held liable for a conviction of murder by being guilty through the legal definition of common intention given that Yasin did the killing through his own individual impulse to commit sexual assault, hence they find 28-year-old Harun guilty of robbery by night, and sentenced him to 12 years' imprisonment and 12 strokes of the cane.

As for Yasin, he was found guilty of murder for causing Poon's death, and the two judges sentenced him to death by hanging. Yasin was promptly placed on death row in Changi Prison with 14 other inmates waiting to be executed.

== Yasin's appeal and Privy Council's reprieve ==
After he was sentenced to death, Yasin submitted an appeal against the death sentence to the Court of Appeal. On 4 November 1974, however, the three judges hearing the appeal - T Kulasekaram, Tan Ah Tah and Chief Justice Wee Chong Jin - found that there was no doubt that Yasin had intentionally caused the nine fatal broken rib injuries on Poon, which therefore fitted the definition of murder under Section 300(c) of the Penal Code and thus appropriate for Yasin to be convicted of murder by application of the law. They also accepted the forensic evidence by Professor Chao, as argued by prosecutor Glenn Knight (who replaced Pala Krishnan and assigned the case), that the fractures were caused by compression of the chest with some force, This compelled the judges to dismiss Yasin's appeal.

After the failure of his appeal at the Court of Appeal, Yasin was left with two remaining avenues of appeal - one was to the Privy Council in London and another was to appeal for a pardon from the President of Singapore - which would enable him to escape the gallows if successful. Yasin was later granted leave to appeal to the Privy Council, which heard his appeal on 17 May 1975.

On 4 February 1976, Singapore's national newspaper The Straits Times reported that Yasin had successfully escaped the death sentence when the Privy Council allowed his appeal against the death sentence. In their verdict, the three Privy Council judges, led by Lord Diplock, found that there was no evidence to suggest that Yasin had intended to cause the death of Poon when he sat on her chest. They also said that while the prosecution had duly proven that Yasin knew what he was doing and intended to sit on the chest (which was voluntary), they commented that it failed to give rise to the contention that Yasin had intended to cause the fatal rib fractures on Poon or knew that the injuries he caused to the victim would be sufficient to kill her.

The three Lords further scrutinized the case and stated that the prosecution's burden of proof was to show that Yasin had indeed sat on the chest of Poon to stop her from struggling and in the process, intentionally caused the grave injuries that were medically possible to cause the death of someone of Poon's original age and build even if Yasin himself genuinely did not have the medical knowledge of what he was doing, and they said the prosecution failed to fulfill it, since there was no evidence of whether Yasin had indeed sat on Poon's chest and the judges only inferred that Yasin did so from the forensic evidence provided by Professor Chao.

As such, the Privy Council in London dismissed the murder charge and revoked Yasin's death sentence. Instead, they found him guilty of causing death by a rash or negligent act not amounting to culpable homicide under Section 304A of the Penal Code. The case was remitted back to the Court of Appeal in Singapore for re-sentencing. It was also confirmed that Yasin would be facing a re-trial for the rape of Poon while causing her to die.

On 18 May 1976, Yasin was sentenced to the maximum of two years' imprisonment for the reduced charge he was convicted of.

== Re-trial of Yasin for rape ==
Following the reprieve from death row by the Privy Council, Yasin was soon brought back to court in Singapore, with the prosecution charged him with raping Poon. DPP Sant Singh became in charge of the case, and defence lawyer Murugason became Yasin's new lawyer for the retrial.

Yasin claimed trial in the High Court for rape on 9 May 1977. His former accomplice Harun, who was then serving his 12-year sentence in Changi Prison, was called by the prosecution to be a witness against Yasin. Harun, who took the stand on 11 May, told the court that Yasin had done the act while he was in another room ransacking for valuables, and claimed that when he returned, he asked Yasin what happened, with Yasin replying to him that he had intercourse with the woman. Yasin denied telling Harun that he had sexually penetrated the older woman, and insisted that he had not raped the woman and only intended to come to Pulau Ubin with Harun to steal from Poon, who kept a lot of cash in her home.

On 12 May, Yasin's trial for rape ended. High Court judge A. P. Rajah determined that Yasin had indeed intended to have sex with Poon against her will. Despite so, Justice Rajah fell short of finding Yasin fully guilty of rape and instead convict the former labourer of attempted rape, as from the nature of the forensic evidence, he was not entirely satisfied that Yasin had sexual intercourse with the victim while she was still alive, and thus gave Yasin the benefit of the doubt. Despite not finding him guilty of rape, Justice Rajah admonished Yasin for committing such an atrocious crime on the unfortunate Poon, in his own words, "However, I find that you manifested this intention to have intercourse with the woman, and in furtherance of your intention, you did a number of acts against the deceased with a view to attaining your objective."

For his conviction of attempted rape, Yasin was sentenced to eight years' imprisonment for the crime. The sentence was backdated to the date of his arrest on 10 February 1973. The two-year sentence which Yasin received for killing Poon was to run consecutively with the term of eight years.

== Release and aftermath ==
=== Release from prison ===
According to prison statistics released by Singaporean crime show True Files, it was revealed that after serving a total of 10 years in prison since 1973, Yasin was released in 1983 after serving his full sentence for the rape and murder of Poon. After his release in 1983, Yasin led a low-profile life and his whereabouts were unknown.

Similarly, Yasin's former accomplice Harun was released in 1985 after spending 12 years (his full sentence) in Changi Prison.

=== Abolition of avenue of appeal to the Privy Council ===
In the aftermath of Yasin's case, Singapore continued its legal avenue to appeal to the Privy Council regarding its cases. It was only in April 1994 that this avenue was finally abolished, leaving only the Court of Appeal of Singapore, the highest court of Singapore, as the final avenue where all criminals, including death row inmates, could appeal against the verdicts of the lower courts of the nation.

Many lawyers reportedly did not react negatively to the abolition, as the general feeling among the legal community was that Singapore, as an independent and sovereign nation, should not rely on foreign jurisdictions to decide their own cases and the judges in London might not be willing to be involved in the legal developments of Singapore and its cases.

=== In the media ===
More than 32 years after the murder of Poon, the case of Yasin and Harun was re-enacted on the Singaporean crime show True Files. It aired as the sixth episode of the show's third season on 29 November 2004, and was currently viewable via meWATCH since 5 February 2016. Yasin's former lawyer G Raman, and Sant Singh, the former prosecutor who prosecuted Yasin for rape, were both interviewed on-screen.

G Raman, who was interviewed first, stated that he actually felt relieved that his former client, who did not intend to cause death, was being spared from the gallows, though he simultaneously felt disturbed as a life had been lost. He said that because of this, even if he had escaped the death penalty, Yasin would not escape the condemnation that society would hold against him for killing someone.

Sant Singh, who was interviewed last, told the interviewers that even till today, he firmly believed that Yasin was not remorseful at all for raping and murdering Poon, from how he denied till the end that he sexually assaulted the elderly woman before he caused her to die on that night of 22 April 1972. He said that it was a hideous crime for raping a woman, especially an older woman.

In the True Files episode, notable criminal lawyer Subhas Anandan was interviewed and gave his analysis of Yasin's case and explained the apparent differences between British law and Singaporean law (which was inherited from the British since its colonial period). He stated that some countries required a motive to find a person guilty of murder, while Singapore did not need to prove any motive behind a murder to find a person guilty, as long as there is an intention to cause death or any bodily injury resulting in death. He stated that the Privy Council back then may have felt that Yasin never intended to cause the fatal injury and thus it cannot constitute as an offence of murder and concluded that the woman had just unfortunately died.

== Significance of case ==
In the aftermath of Yasin's case, the Privy Council's verdict, titled Mohamed Yasin bin Hussin v Public Prosecutor, became one of the notable judgements that questioned the context, definition and existence of murder under Section 300(c) of the Penal Code (under which Yasin was originally convicted of).

Original text of Section 300(c) (Extracted from the Penal Code):

(c): if it is done with the intention of causing bodily injury to any person, and the bodily injury intended to be inflicted is sufficient in the ordinary course of nature to cause death

There were discussions related to the Privy Council's verdict regarding the need to find a person guilty of murder with no intention to kill. The verdict by the Privy Council was in the direction of a "precise injury" approach, which was produced by the three Lords who felt there was a lack of intention on Yasin's part to cause the precise injuries to cause Poon's death. It contradicted the Singaporean courts' normal procedure to convict a person of murder with a "broad injury" approach, which they adopted from an Indian court case verdict Virsa Singh v the State of Punjabi relating to find a person guilty of intentionally inflicting a serious injury which is sufficient to kill regardless of whether he/she knew the fatality of the injury even if he/she had no intention to kill, leading to confusion among the judges in Singapore

Being constantly cited in later murder verdicts in later years since 1976, the Yasin verdict was one of the judgements in which it questioned the problematic application of Section 300(c) in court cases to find a person guilty of murder with no intention to cause death, and its wording gave rise to ambiguity to its real definition. Other cases like Lim Poh Lye and Tan Chee Hwee had also, like Yasin's case, asked such a question about the section, and it contained the judges' own reservations about sentencing an offender, who never intended to kill in the first place or had any knowledge that death would arise from the injuries caused, to death for murder. There was also some criticism directed at the Yasin verdict for not giving a precise explanation about the precise injury approach or its decision, in relation to the context of Section 300(c) (e.g. Tan Cheow Bock v PP).

The Privy Council's verdict over Yasin's case is included as a case study in the syllabus of Singapore's law courses in universities such as the National University of Singapore and Singapore Management University. It is also included as one of the subjects tested in the bar examinations in Singapore.

== See also ==
- Capital punishment in Singapore
- List of major crimes in Singapore
