= Chek Jawa =

Cape and wetlands in Singapore

Coordinates: 01°24′29.06″N 103°59′32.28″E

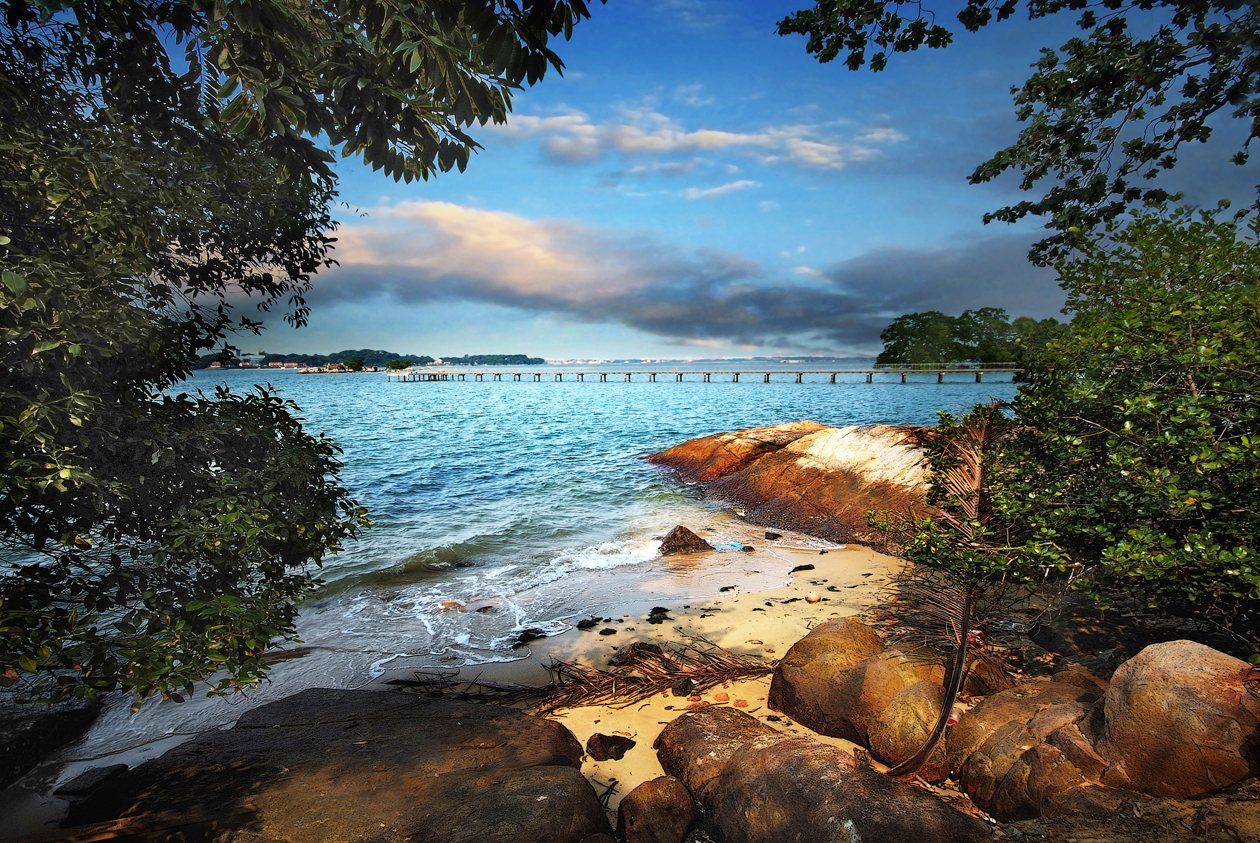
Chek Jawa

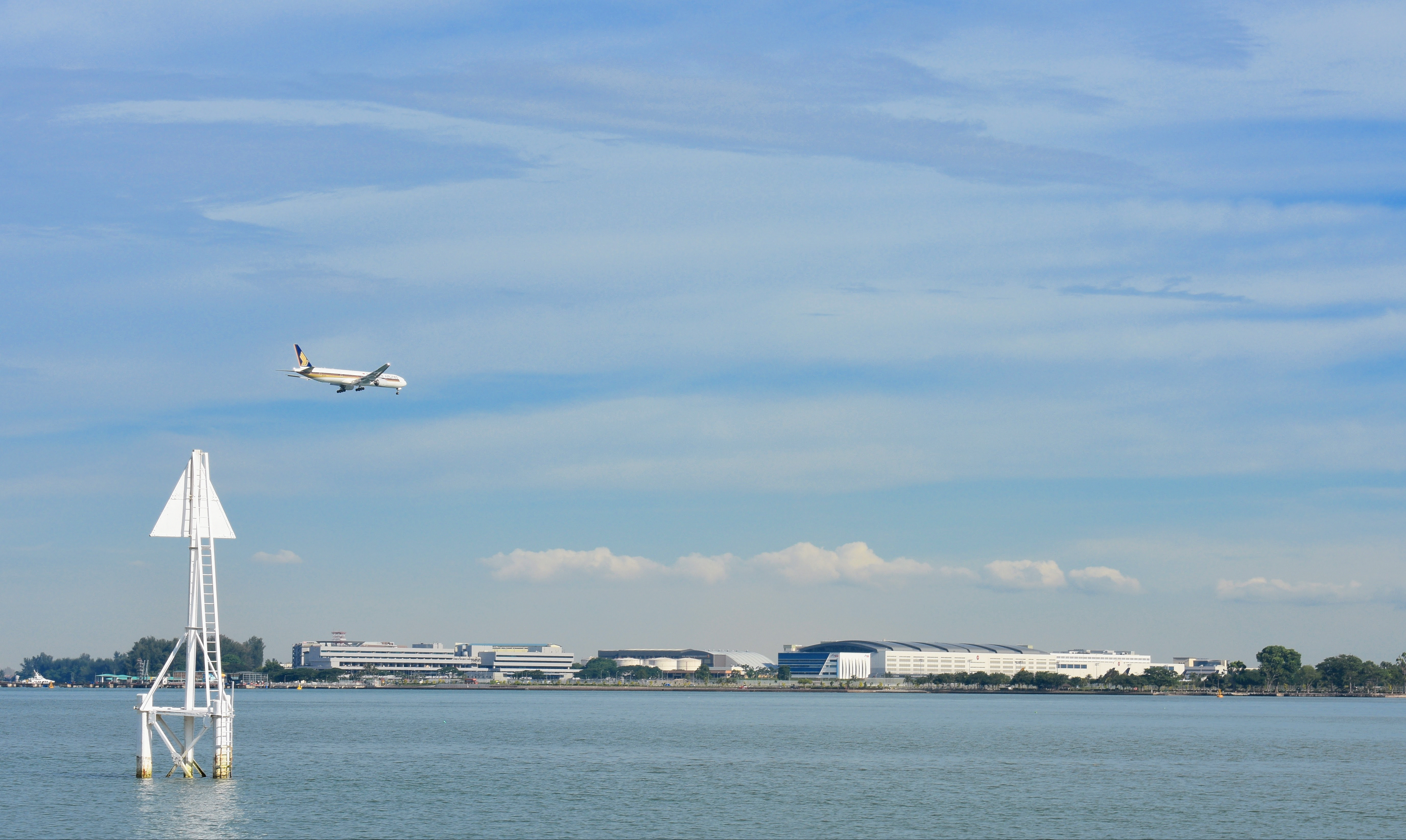
Front Beacon during high tide at Chek Jawa Wetlands

Tanjong Chek Jawa (or Tanjung Chek Jawa or simply Chek Jawa) is a cape and the name of its 100-hectare wetlands located on the south-eastern tip of Pulau Ubin, an island off the north-eastern coast of the main island of Singapore. Chek Jawa is among the last few places left in Singapore with a natural rocky shore.

The wetlands are unique as several ecosystems can be observed in one area – sandy beach, rocky beach, seagrass lagoon, coral rubble, mangroves and coastal forest. The site forms part of the Ubin–Khatib Important Bird Area (IBA), identified as such by BirdLife International because it supports significant numbers of visiting and resident birds, some of which are threatened.

In December 2001, the government called off reclamation plans of the Chek Jawa area after a biodiversity survey conducted by conservationist volunteers. State use of the land has been deferred indefinitely.

== History ==
=== Preservation ===
Previously virtually unknown, Chek Jawa came into national prominence and focus only since the early 2000s when the area's rich biodiversity was discovered almost by chance during a nature outing at low tide. News on the impending land reclamation works planned by the government on the area sparked a rare show of public-led and coordinated effort to reverse the reclamation plans. A group of volunteers, headed by botanist Joseph Lai (who first discovered Chek Jawa's rich ecosystems in December 2000), conducted a biodiversity survey months before the area was to be reclaimed in 2001. This survey was captured on the documentary Remember Chek Jawa by Eric Lin Youwei. The volunteers then submitted a report and petitioned to the government for the preservation of the natural habitat.

The Singapore Government, in turn, surprised many when they acceded to these requests in December 2001. They agreed to leave the Chek Jawa area untouched for the next ten years. The area has been fenced off due to an increase of tourists into the area, damaging the ecosystem in the area. Conservation efforts were made by the Ministry of National Development to preserve the area.

In 2001, the National Parks Board (NParks) took over Chek Jawa's management. NParks conducts free guided tours of Chek Jawa a few times each month during low spring tide periods, and about 20,000 visitors have gone on its tours from 2002 to 2007.

=== Temporary closure ===
In early 2007, Chek Jawa was closed to the public after being damaged by heavy rains in December 2006. Freshwater rains upset the wetlands' saltwater balance, resulting in the widespread death of marine creatures such as sea anemones, seastars, sponges. Tours conducted by NParks were stopped in March that year to let the wetlands recover.

=== Re-opening and new development ===
On 8 July that year, the nature preserve was re-opened to the public and is free of charge. Visitors going to Chek Jawa no longer need to join the free guided tours conducted by NParks. These are conducted only a few times each month during low spring tide periods.

The Singapore Government added new amenities with a visitor management plan for Chek Jawa, at a cost of S$7 million. These included a 1.1-kilometre boardwalk, a 20-metre tall viewing tower and the Chek Jawa Visitor Centre with a viewing jetty.

The boardwalk was built along the coast and into the mangrove area allowing visitors to get up close to plant and marine life such as fiddler crabs and monitor lizards, without damaging the area. Special care was taken to construct the boardwalk, which is made from concrete but simulated to resemble timber. This is more environmentally friendly as it cuts down on the use of wood while still retaining its natural feel.

The free seven-story viewing tower called the Jejawi Tower allows visitors to view the tree canopy and observe birdlife such as the collared kingfisher and straw-headed bulbul.

The visitor center, which was converted from a Tudor-style house built in the 1930s, allowed visitors to learn more about Chek Jawa's wildlife. A small trash receptacle and a soda vending machine are available, otherwise the small kiosk style center is typically unmanned.

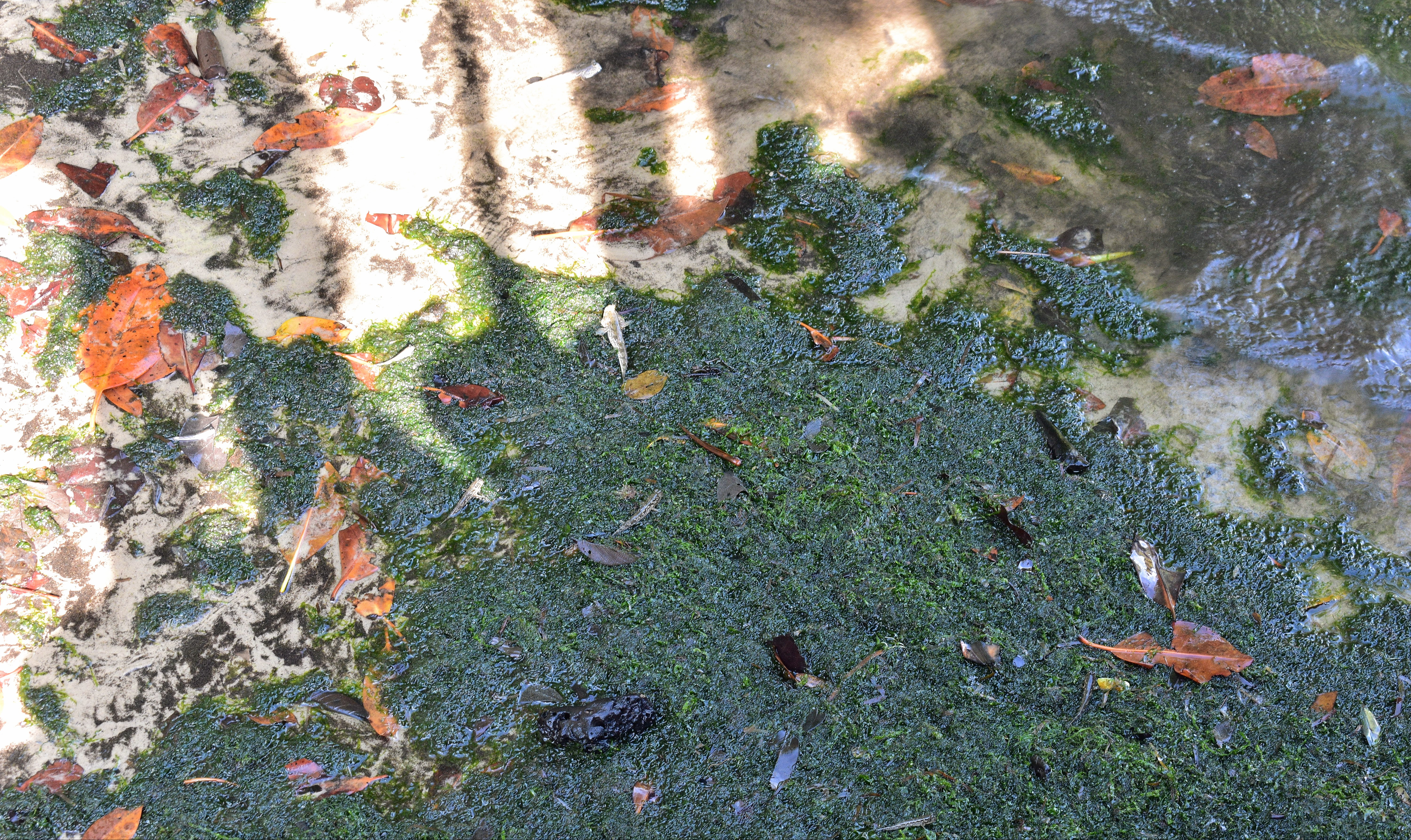
Mudskippers

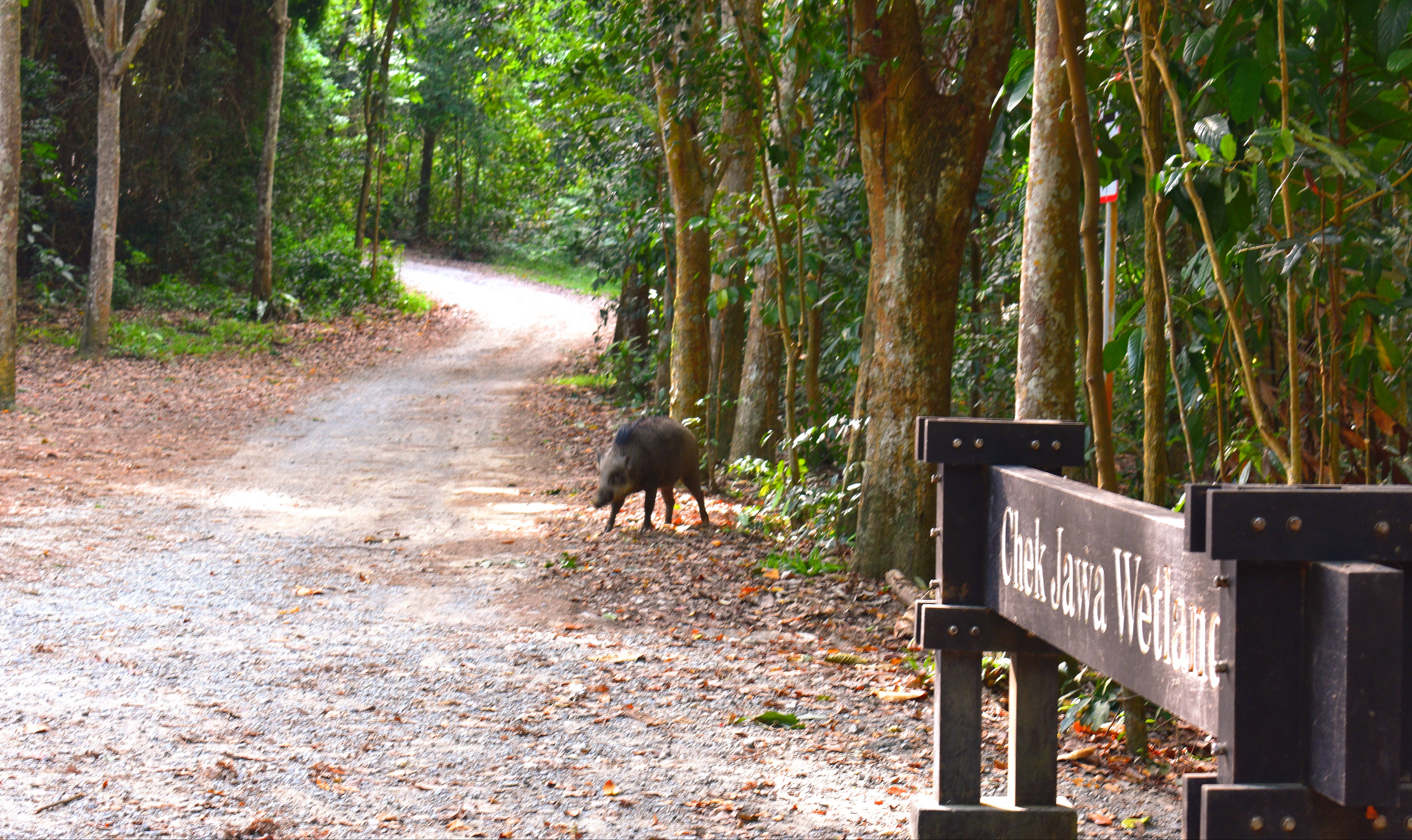
Chek Jawa is also known for its wild boars

== Ecological value ==
Chek Jawa is made up of 6 interdependent ecosystems – namely, its coastal forest, mangrove forest, its rocky shore, the sandy shore, seagrass lagoon and the coral rubble. Within each of the ecosystems, there is an abundance of natural creatures, rare plants, local and migratory birds. These have attracted photographers, nature lovers, student groups and others to visit Chek Jawa.

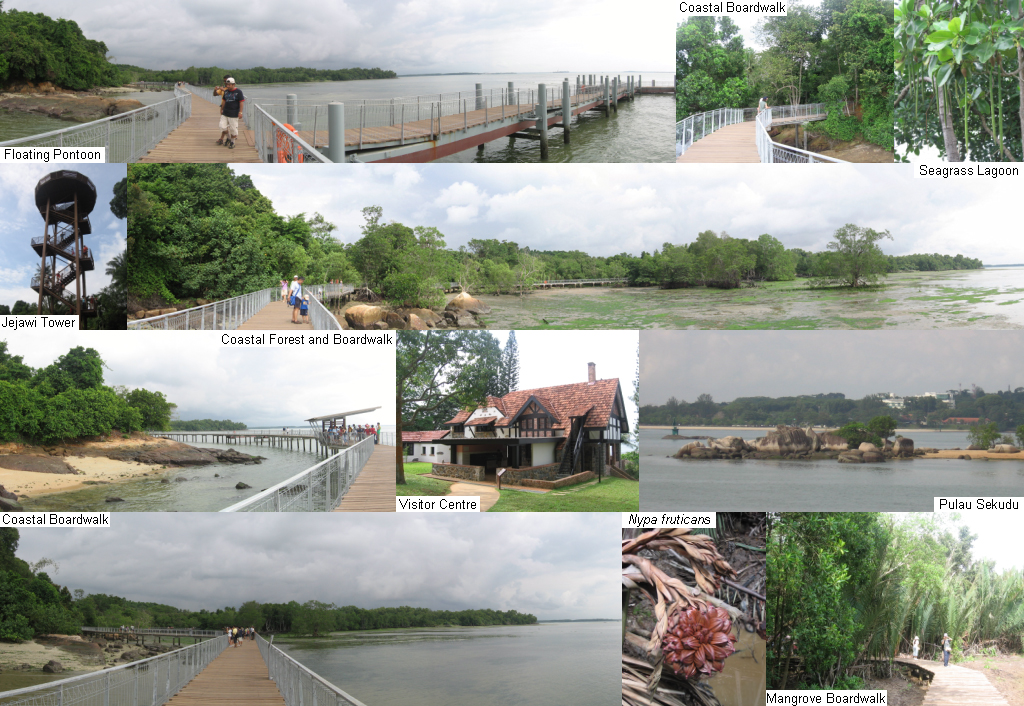
A montage of Chek Jawa, Pulau Ubin, Singapore.
