= Pulau Sajahat =

Coordinates: 1°24′03″N 104°01′13″E

Name transcription(s)
  - Chinese: 沙惹哈岛
  - Pinyin: shārěhā dǎo
  - Malay: Pulau Sajahat
- Interactive map of Pulau Sajahat
- Country: Singapore

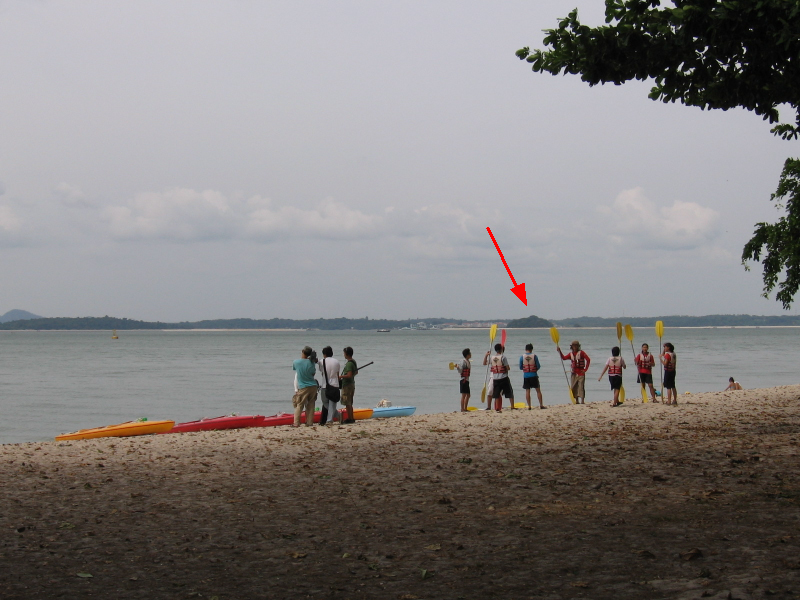
Location of Pulau Sejahat (red arrow) as seen from Changi Beach Park.

Pulau Sajahat (Malay for Sajahat Island), was a small island about 1.2 hectares located off the north-eastern coast of Singapore, near Pulau Tekong. The island, together with its smaller companion Pulau Sejahat Kechil, has been subsumed by Pulau Tekong with the land reclamation works on Pulau Tekong's southern and northwestern coasts.

== See also ==
- History of Singapore
- Battle of Singapore
