= Pulau Ubin =

North-Eastern Island of Singapore

Ubin Island
Native name: Pulau Ubin 烏敏島 உபின் தீவு
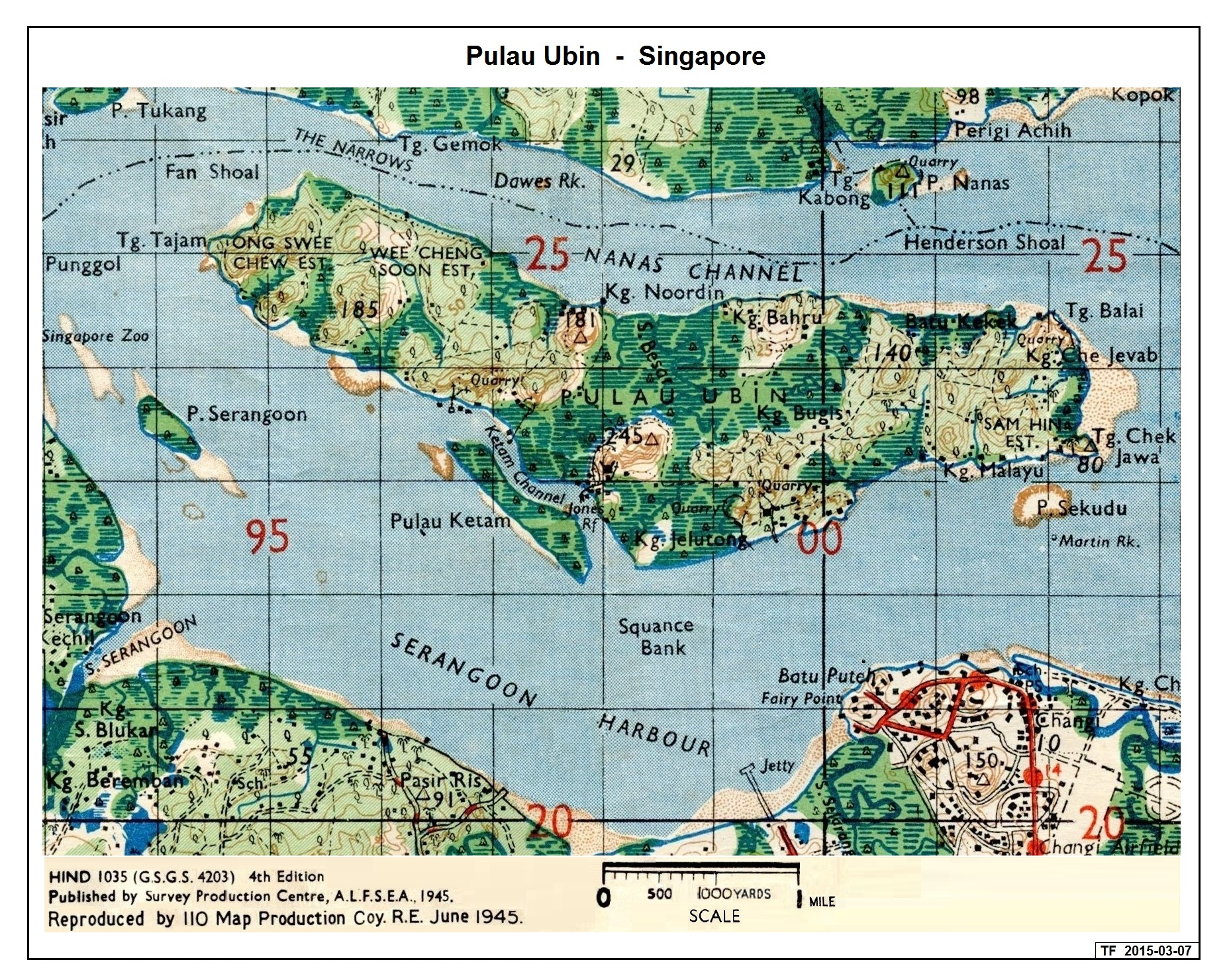
- Map of Pulau Ubin from 1945

- Location within Singapore
- Etymology: Granite Island

Geography
- Location: Southeast Asia
- Coordinates: 1°24′34″N 103°57′36″E
- Archipelago: Malay Archipelago
- Area: 10.19 km^{2} (3.93 sq mi)
- Highest point: Bukit Puaka (75m)

Administration
- Singapore
- Region: North-East Region
- Planning Area: North-Eastern Islands
- CDC: North East CDC
- Town council: Pasir Ris-Changi Town Council
- Constituency: Pasir Ris-Changi GRC
- Largest Settlement: Ubin Town
- Member of Parliament: Valerie Lee

Demographics
- Demonym: Pulau Ubiner; Ubinian; Ubinite
- Population: 40 (2012)
- Ethnic groups: Singaporean Malay Singaporean; Chinese Singaporean; Indian Singaporean

Additional information
- Postal district: 50
- Vehicle registration: PU
- Official website: Pulau Ubin

Pulau Ubin (OO-bin), also simply known as Ubin, is an island situated in the north east of Singapore, to the west of Pulau Tekong. The granite quarry used to be supported by a few thousand settlers on Pulau Ubin in the 1960s, but only about 40 villagers remained as of 2012. It is one of the last rural areas to be found in Singapore, with an abundance of natural flora and fauna. The island forms part of the Ubin–Khatib Important Bird Area (IBA), identified as such by BirdLife International because it supports significant numbers of visiting and resident birds, some of which are threatened. Today, the island is managed by the National Parks Board, compared to 12 agencies managing different areas of the island previously.

== Etymology ==
The name Pulau Ubin literally means "Granite Island" in Malay. Pulau means "island", and Ubin is said to be a Javanese term for "squared stone". To the Malays, the island is also known as Pulau Batu Ubin, or "Granite Stone Island". The rocks on the island were used to make floor tiles in the past and were called Jubin, which was then shortened to Ubin.

The island is known as tsio̍h-suann in the Taiwanese Romanization of Hokkien, which means "stone hill". The highest point is Bukit Puaka (Haunted Hill in Malay) at a height of 75 m.

=== Legend ===
Legend has it that Pulau Ubin was formed when three animals from Singapore (a frog, a pig and an elephant) challenged each other to a race to reach the shores of Johor. The animals that failed would turn to stone. All three came across many difficulties and were unable to reach the shores of Johor. Therefore, the elephant and pig together turned into Pulau Ubin whilst the frog became Pulau Sekudu or Frog Island.

== History ==
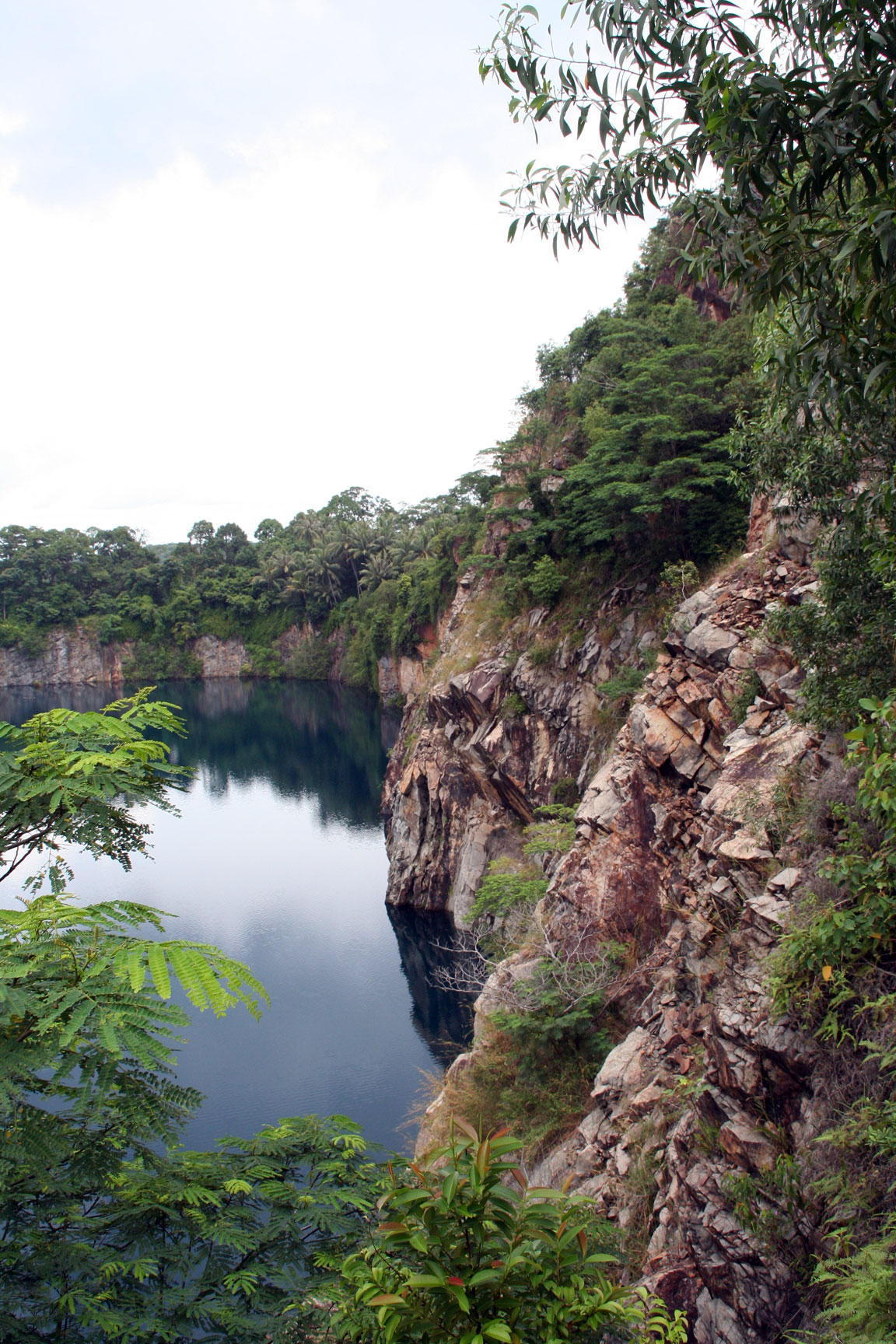
An abandoned quarry on Pulau Ubin.

The British Empire first claimed the island on August 4, 1825 when colonial administrator John Crawfurd led an expedition to the island from Singapore, which had only been colonised 6 years previously.

Pulau Ubin first appeared on map in an 1828 sketch of the Island of Singapore as Pulo Obin and in Franklin and Jackson's map as Po. Ubin. Since the British founding of Singapore, the island has been known for its granite. The numerous granite quarries on the island used to supply the local construction industry. The granite outcrops are particularly spectacular from the sea because their grooves and fluted sides create furrows and ridges on each granite rock slab. These features are captured in John Turnbull Thomson's 1850 painting — Grooved stones on Pulo Ubin near Singapore.

By 1847, Pulau Ubin was settled by the Chinese who starting quarry companies on the island for granite. Later in the 1950s, the British established large-scale quarry operations for granite for the construction of Horsburgh Lighthouse on Pedra Branca.

Later, the granite was also used to build the Singapore-Johor Causeway. All quarries are not in operation today and are being slowly recolonised by vegetation or filled with water. Apart from quarrying, farming and fishing were the principal occupations of the inhabitants of the island in the past. It is also called Selat Tebrau (tebrau is a kind of large fish).

In the early 20th century, cash crops started to be grown on the island, such as coffee, tobacco and rubber. Out of these, however, only rubber was profitable.

In the 1970s, the island had a peak population of 2000 to 4000 people, but as the granite quarries closed down and jobs dwindled, residents began leaving. By the mid-1990s, the population had fallen to 1000 and by 2001 under 200.

Outlined in Urban Redevelopment Authority (URA)'s 1993 master plan, there were plans to build an MRT line connecting the island and Pulau Tekong to mainland Singapore as well as HDB apartments on the island by 2030. In 2013, these plans were removed from URA's updated master plans and authorities announced that there were no plans to develop the island.

In the 1990s, the government approved land reclamation plans for Chek Jawa, a cape and 100-hectare wetlands located on the south-eastern tip of Pulau Ubin, and when the plans were made public in 2001, it drew public criticism, with Singaporeans making appeals to the government to preserve the biodiversity of Chek Jawa instead. After a biodiversity survey conducted by conservationist volunteers in December, 2001, it resulted in the plans being postponed by the government, with the Ministry of National Development stating that the island would not be developed if there is no need for it to be.

In the URA 2011 concept plan, Pulau Ubin is poised to be developed when Singapore's population exceeds a threshold of 6.9 million. According to the plan, HDB flats and a bridge would be built to connect the island with the mainland and Pulau Tekong. However, the government has also stated that it would preserve the island in its current state for as long as possible.

Pulau Ubin's wooden house villages and wooden jetties, relaxed inhabitants, rich and preserved wildlife, abandoned quarries and plantations, and untouched nature make it the last witness of the old kampung Singapore that existed before modern industrial times and large-scale urban development.

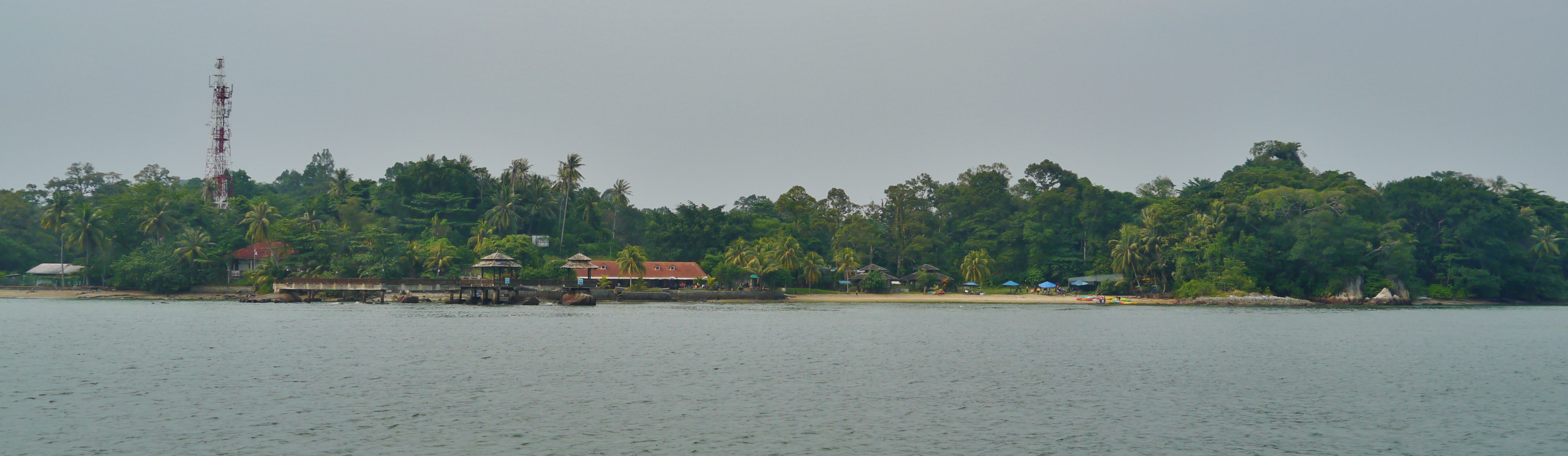
Panorama of Pulau Ubin

== Human settlement ==
In the 1880s, a number of Malays led by Endut Senin from the Kallang River were said to have moved to the island that began the thriving Malay community on the island.

Many of the former kampung on Pulau Ubin were either named after the first person who settled in the kampung or by some feature in the area. Kampung Leman was named by Leman; Kampung Cik Jawa by a Singaporean named Jawa; and Kampung Jelutong from people from Changi and from its jelutong trees. During the 1910s the island was home to a number of German-run coffee plantations. One of the German residents who died in 1914 is commemorated at the German Girl Shrine. During the Japanese invasion of Malaya and Singapore in WWII, the island was captured and occupied by the Imperial Japanese army on the night of 7 February 1942 as a diversionary attack on Singapore. A few Japanese soldiers were killed and wounded in the conquest of the island by a few soldiers and natives who put up a fight. The Japanese created havoc on the island and executed and wounded many locals on the island.

During the 1950s and 1970s, there were 2,000 people living on the island and the Bin Kiang School was established in 1952 for the increasing number of children, from money donated by the Chinese residents. Lessons prior to this were conducted on the village wayang stage. With a student population that once numbered 400, enrolment fell as the Singapore mainland developed. The school closed in 1985, and was demolished on 2 April 2000. There was also a private Malay school around 1956 at Kampung Melayu, which closed in the late 1970s.

Pulau Ubin was found to be suitable for the construction of several campsites. Outward Bound Singapore (OBS) was established in 1967 at Pulau Ubin, by Dr Goh Keng Swee, while the National Police Cadet Corps (NPCC) opened its 25-hectare site camp located between Kampung Bahru and Kampung Noordin. The camp is called Camp Resilience where Secondary 2 and 3 NPCC cadets have a 3-day 2 night stay for training. Secondary 2 NPCC cadets go to Adventure Training Camp (ATC) while Secondary 3 NPCC cadets go to Survival Training Camp (STC). lt was opened officially on 10 August 2004.

On 3 June 2005, the Singapore Government ordered that all the farmers rearing poultry on the island were to ship them to mainland Singapore and rear them in government-approved farms by 17 June 2005, in the wake of the avian influenza. In exchange, the local inhabitants were offered HDB government housing packages, although they could choose to live on the island.

As of 2012, there are only 40 people living on the island.

=== Ubin Town ===
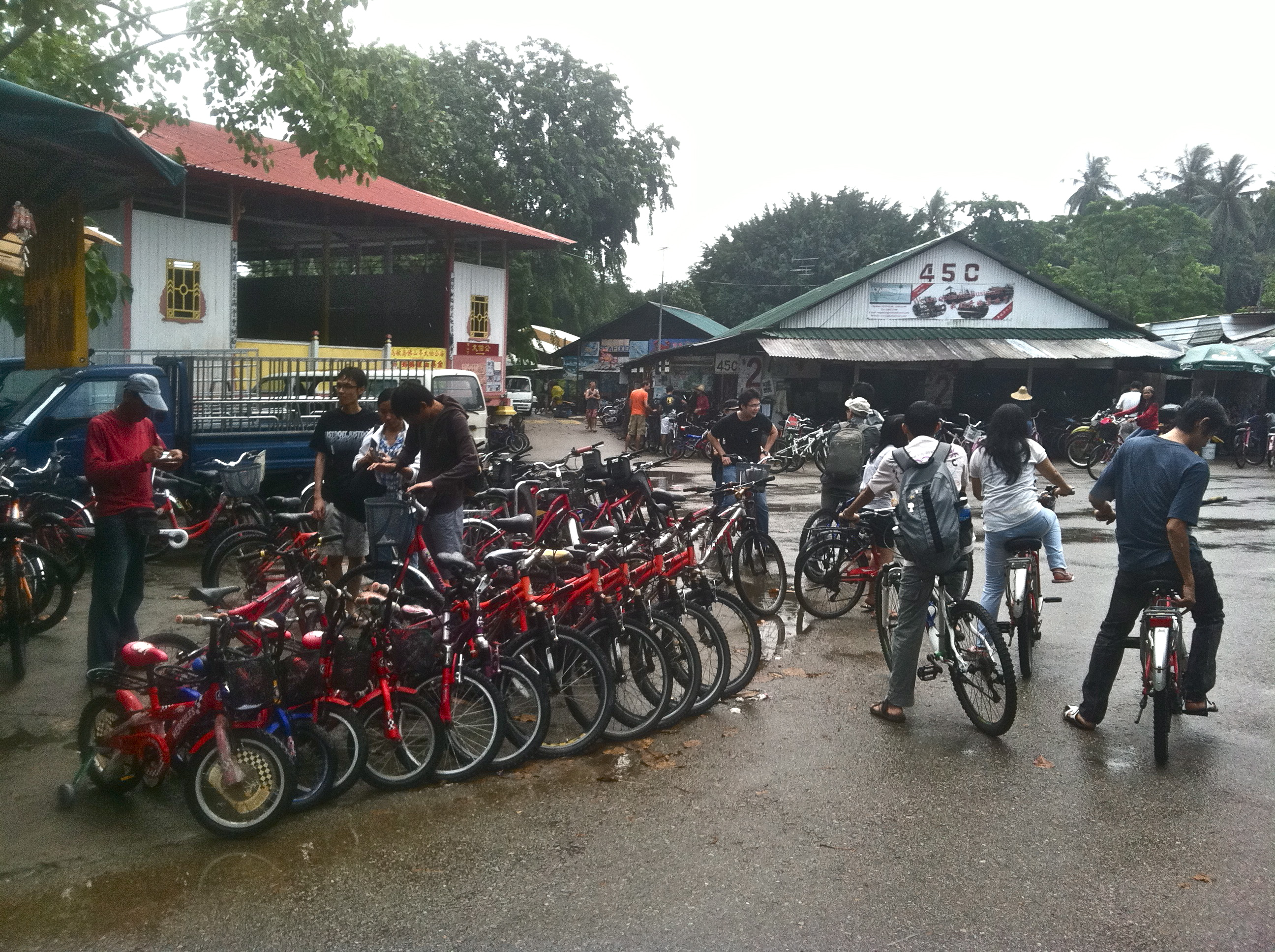
Most of the village consists of cycle shops and cafes, with the Wayang Stage visible in the left background.

Ubin Town is the only settlement on the island. Located near Ubin Jetty, many businesses in the village cater mainly to visitors to the island, with various bicycle shops, restaurants and provision shops dotting the village centre. A Chinese opera stage, managed by the village temple (Fo Shan Teng Tua Pek Kong Temple) is also located in the village centre; it is one of the last three Chinese opera stages that has survived in Singapore. The platform is a characteristic of Southern Chinese temples, where Chinese opera and Getai performances can be held during important festivals presented to the deities of the temple.

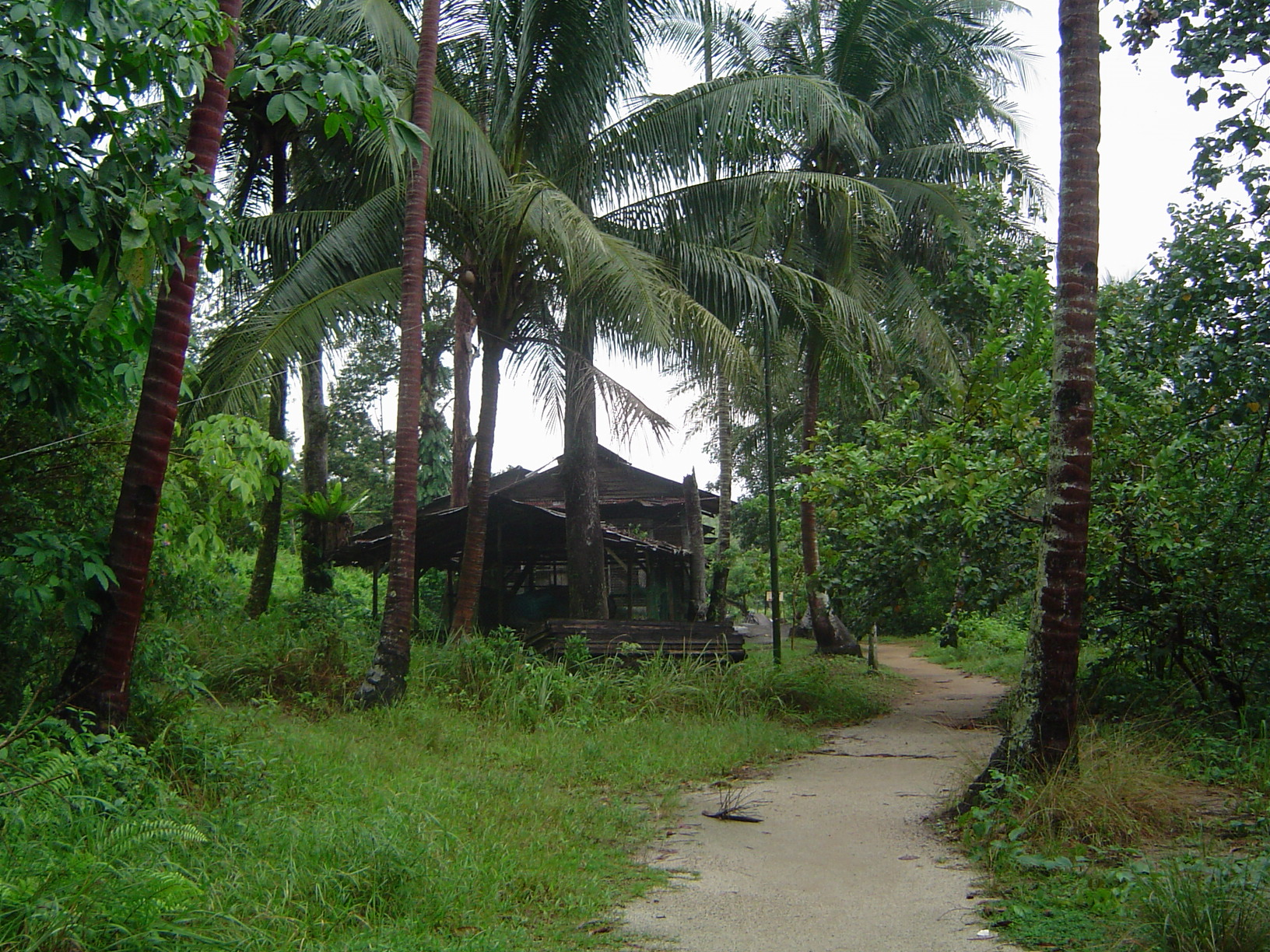
Pulau Ubin is one of the few areas in Singapore that is largely free from urban development.

== Local tourism ==
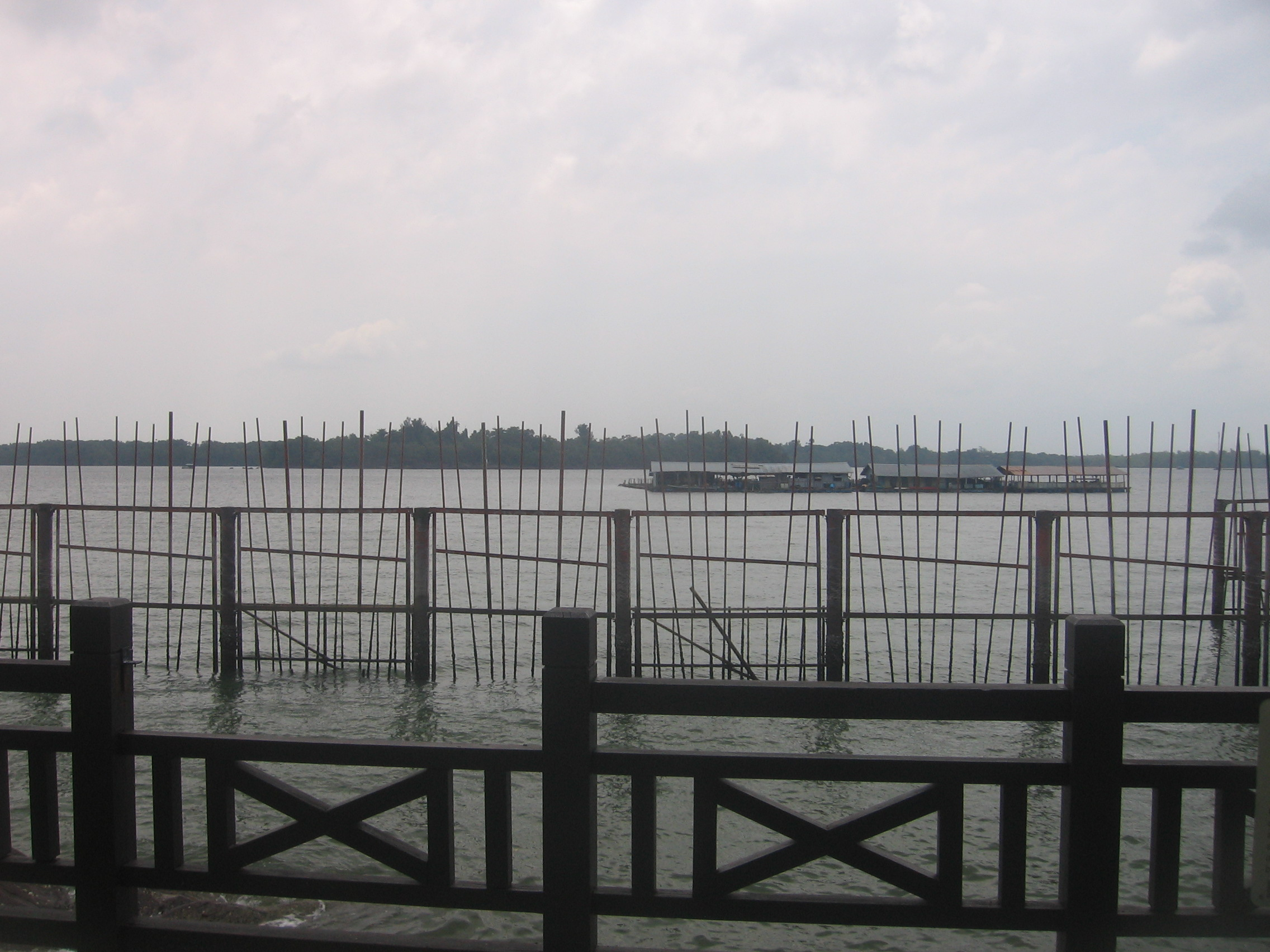
Overlooking Johor, Malaysia from the north shore of Pulau Ubin

Although the island attracted attention for development and planning only in recent years, Pulau Ubin has been popular with Singaporean visitors for recreational activities such as summer camps and outdoor activities. With growing attention and interest in nature, visitors to Pulau Ubin has increased over the years, where according to the National Parks Board, the island sees an estimated 300,000 visitors annually. Pulau Ubin Recreation Area, which included Chek Jawa, was created to cater to local tourism. The site is about 700 hectares within the 1,020-hectare Pulau Ubin.

Amongst the various popular attractions on the island is Chek Jawa, a previous coral reef 5,000 years ago, Chek Jawa can be said to be virtually unspoilt. The wetlands are unique as several ecosystems can be observed in one area and supports a variety of marine wildlife comparable to other islands, such as sea hares, sea squirts, octopuses, starfishes, sand dollars, fishes, sponges, cuttlefishes and nudibranches.

A boardwalk runs through the mangrove, allowing visitors to observe the plant and marine life at close range. During low tide, a limited number of people are allowed to walk on the tidal flats. The prominent Chinese temple, Fo Shan Teng Tua Pek Kong Temple, is also another frequently visited site.

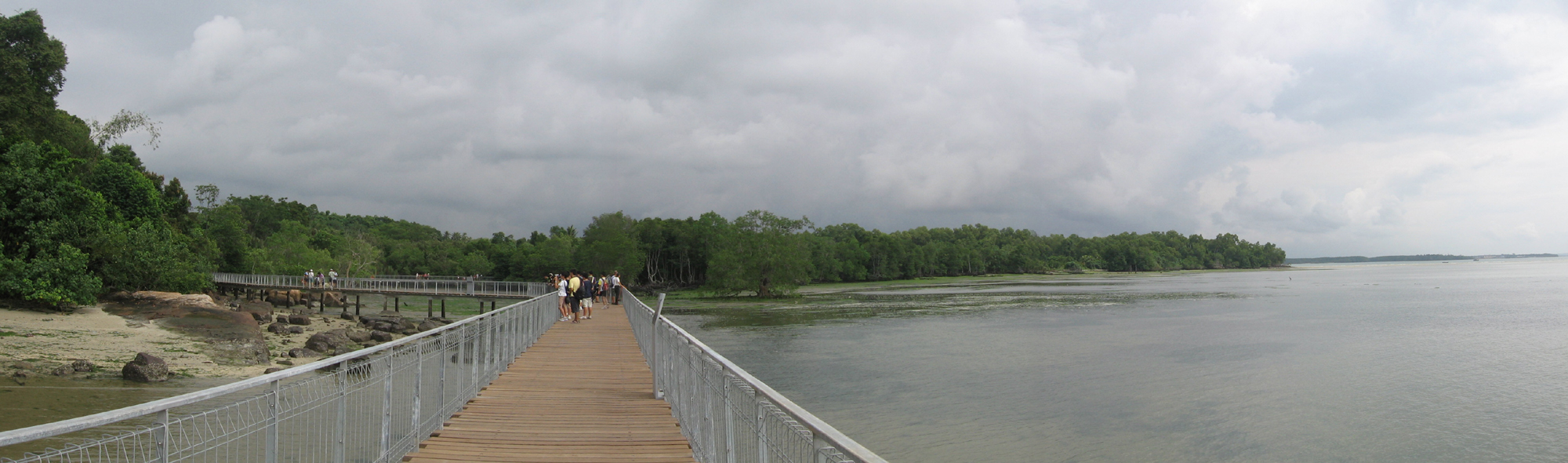
Coastal boardwalk at Chek Jawa

=== Mountain biking ===
Mountain biking is a popular activity on Pulau Ubin and the island is home to one of Singapore's mountain bike trails, Ketam Mountain Bike Park which was built in 2007. The trail is approximately 8 kilometres long, varies in elevation and features a wide range of terrain from open meadows to thick jungle and is well-marked with signs indicating the difficulty level of each section. While a large proportion of visitors to the island bring their own bicycles, rental cycle vendors are prevalent in Ubin town.

== Transportation ==
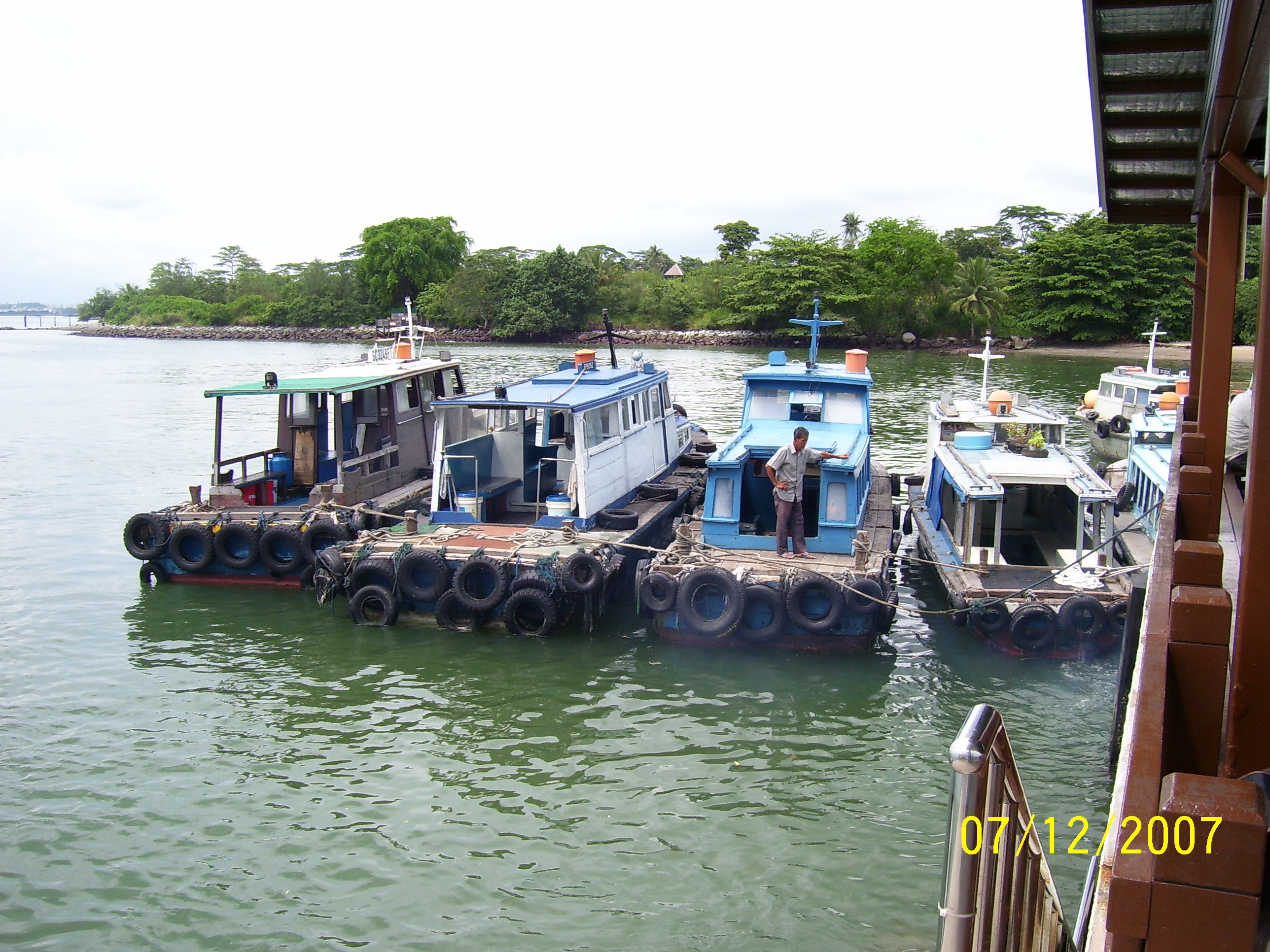
Bumboats waiting at Pulau Ubin jetty for passengers.

Visitors may travel to Pulau Ubin from the main island of Singapore via a 10-minute bumboat ride from the Changi Point Ferry Terminal (previously known as the Changi Village jetty). In 2008, the one-way ticket price was increased from S$2.00 to S$2.50 per passenger. It was further increased to S$3.00 from 7 September 2015 onwards. Since June 2020, it has been S$4.00. Every bumboat can carry 12 passengers and the captain will wait until his boat has reached the maximum capacity. People who do not want to wait can pay S$48.00 for the whole bumboat and leave without waiting.

Transportation around the island can be either be done via bicycles of which the rental price range anywhere from S$8.00 to S$27.00 (for the entire day) depending on the condition of the bike, number of gears etc.

There are no public transportation on the island. For longer distance travel around the island, individuals can hire local taxi services on the island (which is arranged by small coach buses), to get to scenic spots there.

=== Private vehicles ===
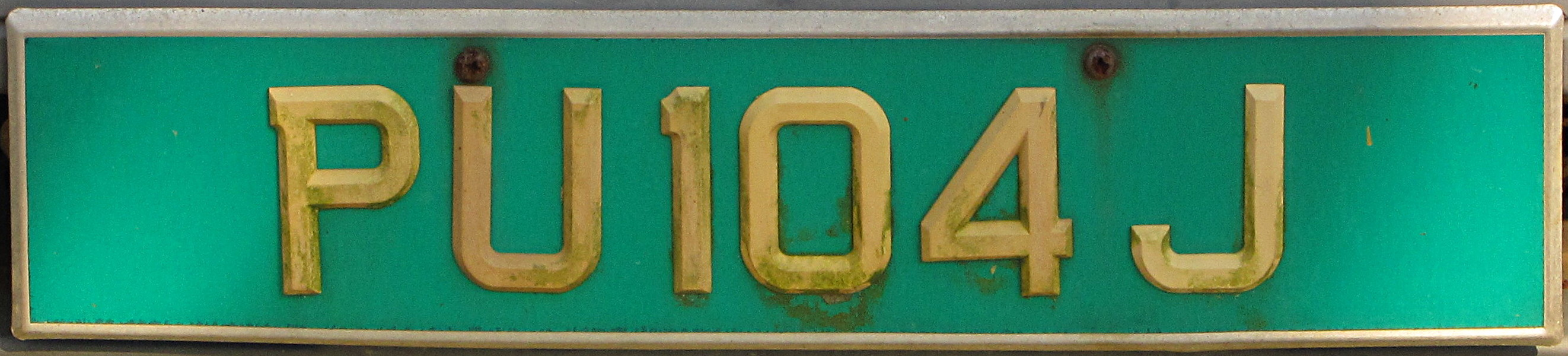
Plate of a vehicle registered in Pulau Ubin

Pulau Ubin operates a separate vehicle registration scheme distinct from that of mainland Singapore, with vehicle licence plates bearing the prefix PU, displayed on green plates with white lettering. Private vehicles on the island are registered under the Pulau Ubin Vehicle Scheme and are exempt from the Certificate of Entitlement (COE) requirement that applies to vehicles registered on the main island.

== Ecological projects ==
=== Hornbill Conservation Project ===
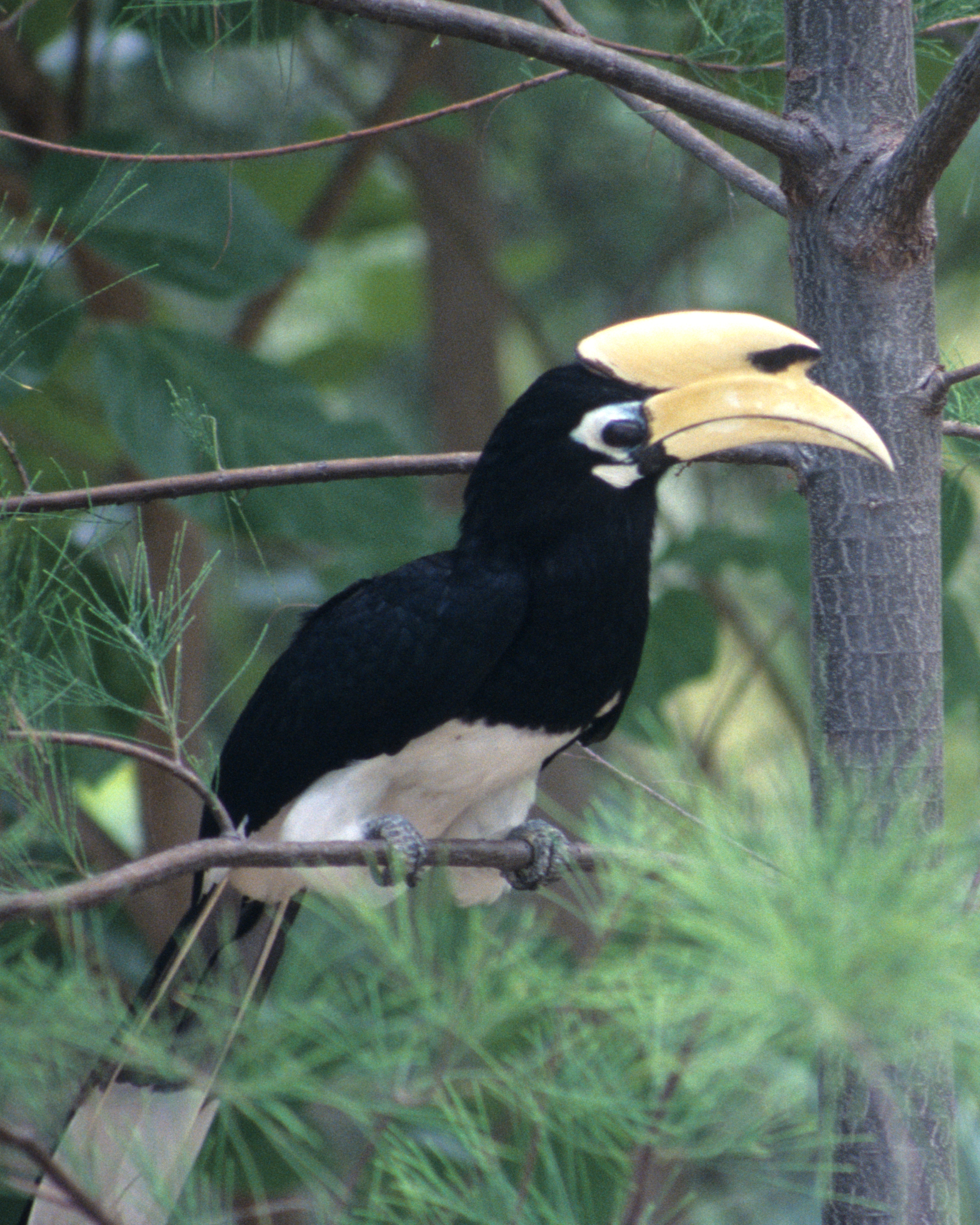
The Oriental pied hornbill that has re-established itself in Singapore.

The National Biodiversity Centre, in partnership with Wildlife Reserves Singapore, Nanyang Technological University, and researchers Marc Cremades and Ng Soon Chye, implemented the Hornbill Conservation Project to aid in the breeding and recovery of the Oriental pied hornbill (Anthracoceros albirostris) which had previously become extinct in Singapore but has since started to re-establish itself in places like Pulau Ubin and Changi.

Hornbills require tree cavities to nest in. However, tree cavities of sufficient size to accommodate the female hornbill and her young are not common in Singapore. The implementation of artificial nest boxes at Pulau Ubin and Changi have been successful and video cameras are even installed within the nest boxes to provide a better understanding of the behavioural and feeding patterns of these birds.

=== Seahorse Monitoring Project ===
Since May 2009, the National Biodiversity Centre, together with volunteers from National Parks Board and nature groups such as Wild Singapore and TeamSeaGrass, initiated a project to monitor identified populations of seahorse (Hippocampus kuda) and pipefish (Syngnathoides biaculeatus) in several locations including Pulau Ubin for conservation management purposes. The data gathered will help to estimate the population size, growth rate of individuals and track their movements in their natural habitats.

== In popular culture ==
- In 1989, SBC (now renamed Mediacorp), filmed a television drama named Good Morning, Sir. The drama was set in the 1950s where a woman from the main island of Singapore went to Pulau Ubin to work as a teacher.

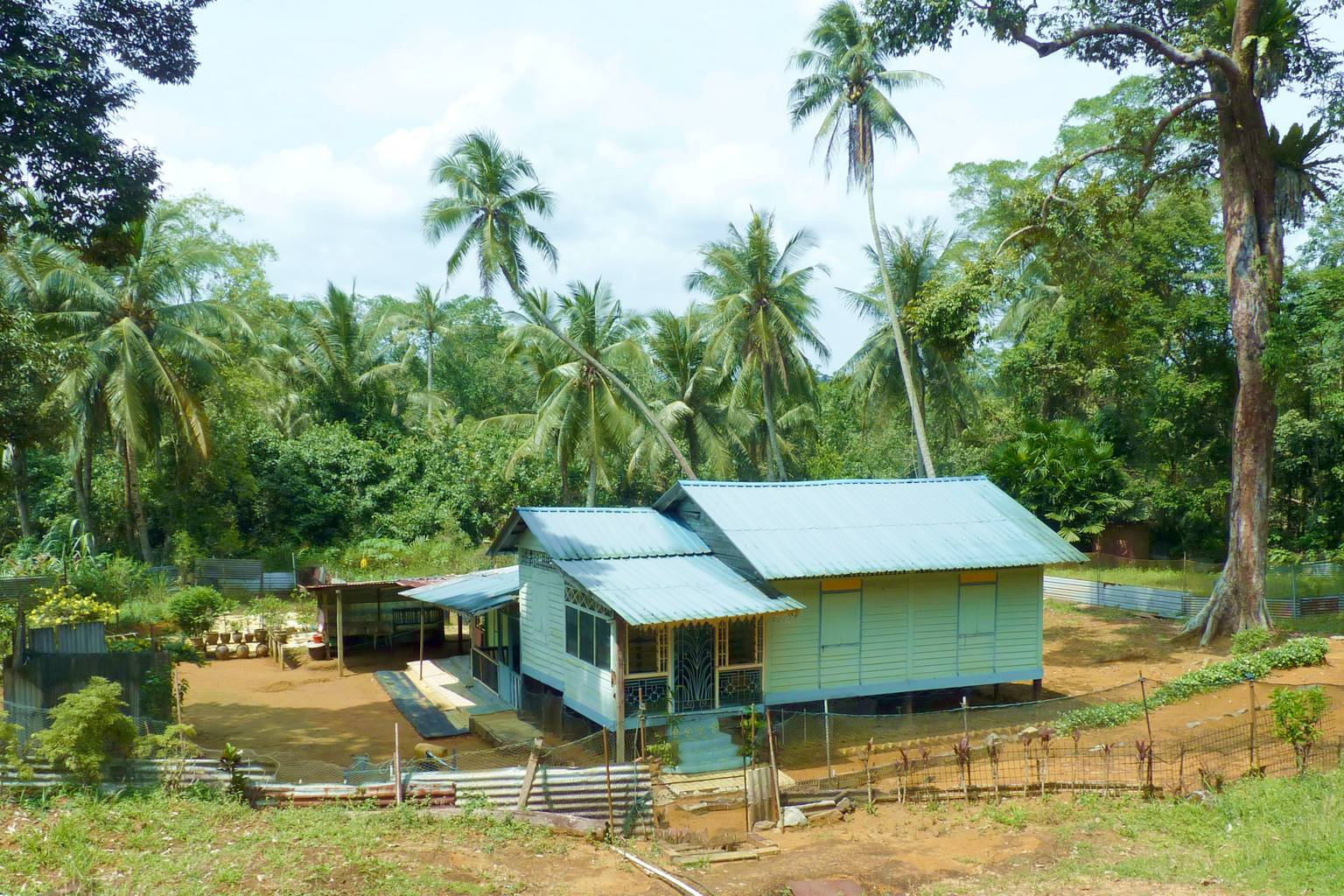
A traditional kampung house on Pulau Ubin.

- In 1999, Mediacorp filmed a Channel 8 television drama called My Teacher, My Friend about the lives of students in the primary school that used to exist on Pulau Ubin.
- In 2006, Mediacorp broadcast a Kids Central (now Okto on 5) television drama series titled Ubin Boy. The plot revolved around two main characters, Steven (a mainland citizen) and his cousin Ah Boy living in Pulau Ubin.
- In the Danny Wallace book Yes Man, Wallace visits Pulau Ubin after it is suggested to him (and to which he must agree) after he visits Singapore. He is told the island is a paradise and must visit it by a local taxi driver.
- The Amazing Race 25 visited this island when the teams arrived in Singapore.
- Mediacorp filmed a Channel 8 television drama called Hand In Hand in 2015 about four siblings in search of a suspicious figure on Pulau Ubin who looks like their father.

== See also ==
- Fo Shan Ting Da Bo Gong Temple
- German Girl Shrine
- 1972 Pulau Ubin murder
