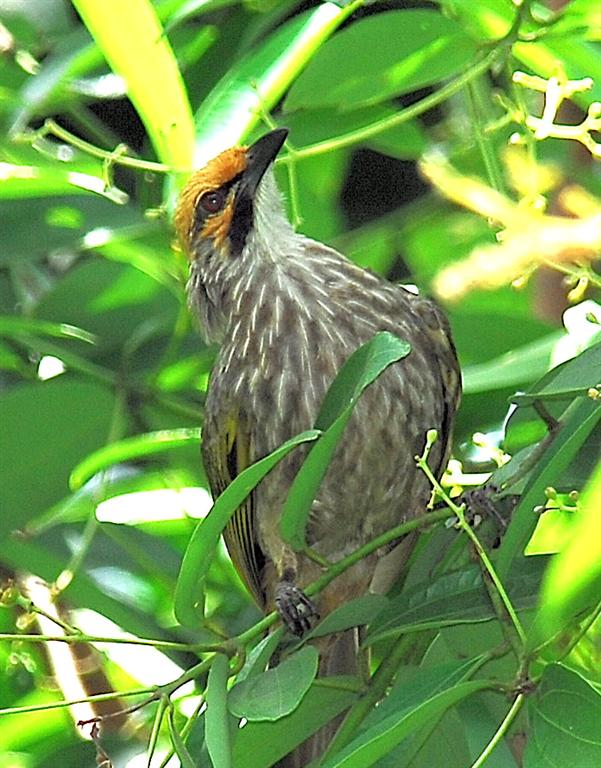
- In Singapore

Conservation status
- Critically Endangered (IUCN 3.1)
- CITES Appendix I

Scientific classification
- Kingdom: Animalia
- Phylum: Chordata
- Class: Aves
- Order: Passeriformes
- Family: Pycnonotidae
- Genus: Pycnonotus
- Species: P. zeylanicus

Binomial name
- Pycnonotus zeylanicus (Gmelin, JF, 1789)
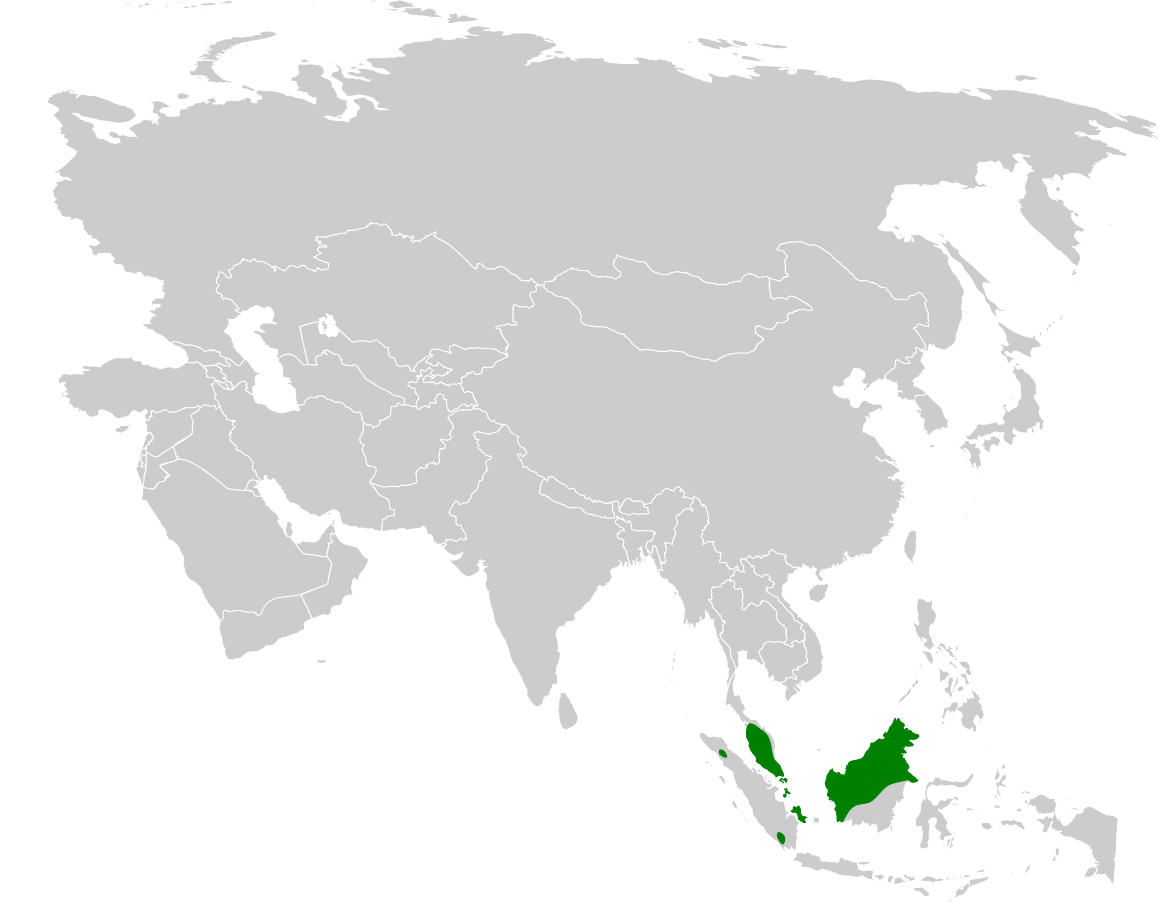

Synonyms
- Sturnus zeylanicus (protonym)

= Straw-headed bulbul =

Species of songbird

The straw-headed bulbul (Pycnonotus zeylanicus) is a species of songbird in the bulbul family, Pycnonotidae. It is found from the Malay Peninsula to Borneo. Its natural habitats are subtropical or tropical moist lowland forest, subtropical or tropical mangrove forest, subtropical or tropical moist shrubland, arable land, plantations, and rural gardens. It is threatened by habitat loss and poaching from humans.

The straw-headed bulbul is prized for its singing ability and is a highly sought-after species by bird enthusiasts in Southeast Asia, especially Indonesia. This trade is causing population reductions across the species' range and is a major barrier to its conservation. Trapping has been facilitated in recent years by the spread of logging roads across its forest habitat. Due to this, the straw-headed bulbul was uplisted from endangered to critically endangered on the IUCN Red List in 2018.

== Taxonomy and systematics ==
The straw-headed bulbul was formally described in 1789 by the German naturalist Johann Friedrich Gmelin in his revised and expanded edition of Carl Linnaeus's Systema Naturae. He placed it with the starlings in the genus Sturnus and coined the binomial name Sturnus zeylanicus. Gmelin based his description on the "Ceylonese stare" that had been described in 1783 by the English ornithologist John Latham in his book A General Synopsis of Birds. The English name chosen by Latham and Gmelin's specific epithet were both based on the mistakenly belief that the species was found in Sri Lanka. In 1924 Herbert C. Robinson and C. Boden Kloss designated the type locality as Java. The straw-headed bulbul is now one of 32 species placed in the genus Pycnonotus that was introduced in 1826 by the German zoologist Friedrich Boie. The species is monotypic: no subspecies are recognised.

Alternate names for the straw-headed bulbul include the star-crowned bulbul, straw-crowned bulbul and the yellow-crowned bulbul.
