= Pulau Tekukor =

Islet in the Singapore Strait

Tekukor Island
Pulau Tekukor 德固哥岛 தேகுகொர் தீவு
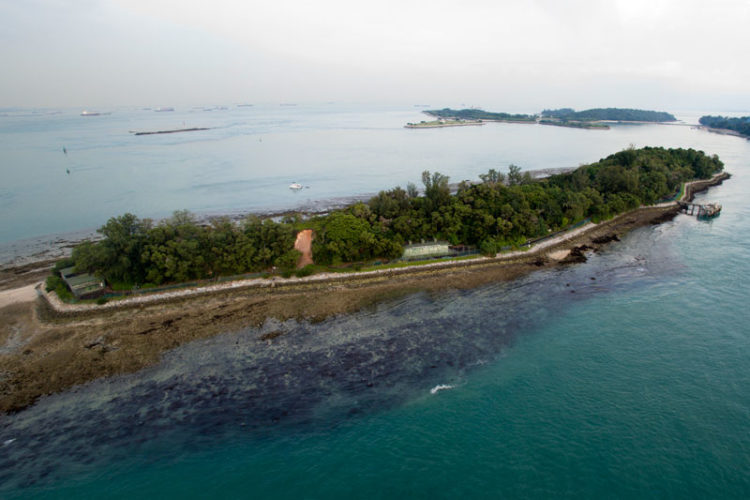
- Pulau Tekukor in 2022

- Location within Singapore
- Etymology: Spotted dove

Geography
- Location: Southeast Asia
- Coordinates: 1°13′51″N 103°50′16″E
- Archipelago: Malay Archipelago
- Area: 5.07 (Note: After land reclamation in 1980) ha (12.5 acres)
- Length: 650 m (2130 ft)
- Width: 100 m (300 ft)

Administration
- Singapore
- Planning Area: Southern Islands

Pulau Tekukor (Note: (Chinese: 德固哥岛; pinyin: Dégùgē dǎo; English: Tekukor Island)) is a small island in the Singapore Strait, located off the southern coast of Singapore Island, and is included in the Southern Islands planning area. The island, with an area of approximately 0.6 hectares (1.5 acres), has a relatively high diversity of plant life, with approximately 110 vascular plant species being identified. At least 22 of these are threatened at the national level. Pulau Tekukor is also home to populations and mature individuals of several locally rare plant species.

== Etymology ==
The island's name is believed to originate from the Malay word tekukur, which refers to the spotted dove.

== Geography ==
Pulau Tekukor is an island to the south of Singapore Island, between the southern extremity of Pulau Blakang Mati (Sentosa) and West Saint John's Island. Two mid-channel shoals measuring approximately 4.6 and 5.0 metres are located in the Pulau Tekukor–Pulau Blakang Mati channel. The western island proper measures approximately 650 metres in length and 100 metres in breadth. Reclaiming works in 1980 increased its western portion by 1.43 hectares, increasing its overall area of land to 5.07 hectares from 3.64 hectares.

Pulau Tekukor features a variety of natural habitats like rocky outcrops and sandy beaches. It has natural vegetation covering about 4.01 hectares or 79.1% of the island in the form of 1.70 hectares (33.5%) of coastal forest and 2.31 hectares (45.6%) of coastal scrub. The other 1.06 hectares (20.9%) are utilised by other land uses that include 0.05 hectares (1.0%) of bare ground and 1.01 hectares (19.9%) by built-up areas such as buildings and roads.

Pulau Tekukor is geologically identical with neighbouring St John's Island, being composed of nearly vertical beds of sandstone and conglomerate. This has resulted in spectacular cliffed shores with no shore platform and only a thin or absent beach. A very narrow sandy beach, backed by vertical rock outcrops and low reddish sandstone cliffs of the Tanjong Rimau Formation with hummocky cross-stratification and quartz precipitation, is seen along the northeast coast. The northern end of the island features a fiat sand beach of quartz with scattered angular cobble to boulder-sized clasts, suggesting limited transport and ongoing erosion.

A prominent 5–7 metre-high outcrop of well-cemented coarse sandstone provides habitat for intertidal animals such as sea anemones and sea cucumbers. The south and southeast coastlines expose spectacular portions of vertically bedded pale to dark pink sandstone with intricate cross-bedding, likely deposited under ancient riverine or lacustrine environments. The beds are deformed by coarse conglomerates overlain abruptly by fine sandstone, exhibiting alternations between high- and low-energy depositional environments.

== History ==
In the 1980s, Pulau Tekukor was retired as an arms storage site. It was then acquired under the Urban Redevelopment Authority's (URA) Development Guide Plan for the Southern Islands, which included Sentosa, Pulau Seringat, Saint John's Island, Lazarus Island, Kusu Island, and the Sisters' Islands. Started in 1996 and included in the Master Plan 1998, the plan was part of a larger national vision to convert these islands, such as Tekukor, into potential tropical island resorts. Pulau Tekukor is part of the Sisters' Islands Marine Park approved by NParks in 2015, which also includes Saint John's Island and has marine research, conservation, and public outreach functions.

== Flora and fauna ==
Pulau Tekukor possesses a varied vascular flora of 151 species in 61 families with one lycophyte species, 15 fern species, and 135 angiosperms. Of these, 86 are indigenous and 22 nationally threatened from nationally extinct through to critically endangered, endangered, or vulnerable. There are also 65 non-native or exotic species found on the island, although the number may be under represented.

Most significant are the island's forests, which are dominated by big stands of Tristaniopsis species, such as critically endangered Tristaniopsis obovata and endangered Tristaniopsis whiteana. Another critically endangered species is Fagraea auriculata, which consists of a single mature tree on a cliff overlooking the sea and a few nearby saplings. The pitcher plant Nepenthes rafflesiana is widespread and vulnerable, particularly on cliff faces exposed to the wind.

Among exotic vegetation, Acacia auriculiformis is particularly common in areas previously disturbed along the southwest coast of the island. The oriental magpie-robin, a nationally threatened species that was recentlyrecorded on the island in 2020, also occurs in habitat on Pulau Tekukor.
