= 2024 Singapore oil spill =

Maritime collision

Coordinates: 1.255333°N 103.784861°E

- Interactive map of 2024 Singapore oil spill
- Location: Pasir Panjang Terminal, Singapore
- Date: 14 June 2024

Cause
- Cause: Collision between Vox Maxima and Marine Honour

Spill characteristics
- Volume: 400 tonnes

At 2:18pm on 14 June 2024, the Netherlands-flagged dredger, Vox Maxima collided with a stationary vessel, the Singapore-flagged bunker vessel Marine Honour. The Marine Honour was alongside a container vessel berthed at Pasir Panjang Terminal.

As a result of the collision, about 400 metric tonnes of low-sulphur fuel oil from a damaged cargo tank aboard the Marine Honour was spilled into the surrounding waters.

== Background ==
According to a joint statement by the Maritime and Port Authority (MPA), the National Environment Agency (NEA), the National Parks Board (NParks), and the Sentosa Development Corporation (SDC), the Vox Maxima had reported a sudden loss in engine and steering control prior to colliding with the Marine Honour at 2:18 pm. The collision between the vessels ruptured the Marine Honour's oil cargo tanks, resulting in the low-sulphur Marine Fuel Oil (MFO) 380 within leaking into the surrounding waters.

The Vox Maxima was piloted by marine services provider PSA Marine at the time of the incident. According to PSA Marine, one of its harbour pilots had been on board the Vox Maxima at the time to provide navigational advice, but had not been steering the vessel at the time of the incident.

The MPA was alerted to the incident at 2:22 pm, and had deployed personnel by 2:33 pm to ensure that there were no further leaks from the Marine Honour. Following the leak, the Marine Honour still had about 400 tonnes of fuel oil left in its tanks.

Transport Minister Chee Hong Tat stated on 18 June 2024 that the oil spill had not been caused by port congestion "as our port waters and anchorages are not congested".

== Clean-up efforts ==
The SDC was notified of the oil spill by the MPA at about 3:30 pm on 14 June 2024. At about 9:20 pm the same day, the SDC began cordoning off affected areas of Palawan Beach.

The SDC started deploying workers to clean up the beaches on the morning of 15 June 2024 after the oil spill was spotted in the waters off Sentosa Island at about 7 am. 18 response crafts were deployed in total by various organisations to contain and clean up the oil spill. These included MPA patrol craft which were deployed to spray dispersants on the oil spill, as well as oil skimmers operated by a contractor of the MPA.

Floating booms were deployed around the Marine Honour as a precautionary measure to mitigate any further oil leaks.

On 16 June 2024, the SDC deployed about 100 trained workers across the beaches of Sentosa Island. The workers were equipped with oil booms, vacuum pumps, oil dispersants, skimmers, absorbent materials, and other specialized oil containment and recovery equipment.

Oil Spill Response Limited, which is an industry-funded organisation which assists with responses to oil spills, deployed floating containment and recovery devices to isolate oil on the surface of the sea and skim the oil away.

On 22 July 2024, two areas B and E of the beach at East Coast Park reopened to the public for non-primary contact water sports like kayaking. National Environment Agency (NEA) "continues to monitor beach water quality and water activities can fully resume only when the water quality returns to normal."

== Impact ==
On 15 June 2024, the jetty and rocky shore of Labrador Nature Reserve were closed.

Beaches on St John's Island, Lazarus Island, and Kusu Island were closed on 16 June 2024. There were no signs of any oil slick within the protected Sisters' Islands Marine Park as of 1:30 pm on that day, but oil sheen was seen in the waters around the area.

On 17 June 2024, the Singapore Food Agency stated that there was "low risk" of the oil spill spreading to fish farms along the Johor Straits, but the agency would continue to monitor the situation.

According to Singapore conservation group Marine Stewards, wildlife in the area were affected by the oil spill. The groups stated that it was aware of one kingfisher covered in oil that had been rescued from Marina at Keppel Bay, and that a second kingfisher covered in oil had been spotted at Lazarus Island. In addition, there were also various reported sightings of dead fish and dead sea snakes, as well as monitor lizards and otters covered in oil.

The Public Utilities Board (PUB) stated on 17 June 2024 that the oil spill had not affected Singapore's water supply, explaining that there was "no impact to our freshwater reserves" and the coastal drains affected by the oil spill "convey and discharge stormwater to the sea and are not linked to our reservoirs".

By 20 June 2024, a "large majority" of the oil spills in beaches in Singapore had been removed. Transport Minister Chee Hong Tat stated that it would take "some time" before all the oil deposits are completely removed because the clean-up efforts had thus far focused on oil clearly visible on the surface and the next step would be to "flush out stranded oil, such as those on oil-stained rock bunds".

According to Minister for Sustainability and the Environment, Grace Fu, more than 71,000 kg of oil-soaked sand had been removed from three beaches on Sentosa Island.

Oil spills were not sighted near Chek Jawa Wetlands on Pulau Ubin, Coney Island Park, or Pasir Ris Park.

=== Nearby countries ===
The government of the state of Johor in neighbouring Malaysia stated that it began conducting coastal patrols near Sungai Rengit in Kota Tinggi and was monitoring the situation after being notified by the MPA on 18 June 2024 of the oil spill in Singapore.

Johor Health and Environment Committee chairperson, Ling Tian Soon, stated that the Johor Department of Environment (DoE) had sought assistance from the Southern Region Marine Department, Johor Port Authority, Kota Tinggi District Office, Pengerang Municipal Council, Malaysian Maritime Enforcement Agency, the Marine Police, Royal Malaysian Navy, Civil Defence Force, Dialog Terminals Pengerang Sdn Bhd, and Petroliam Nasional Bhd (Petronas) Pengerang to assist with the patrol and monitoring activities.

The MPA stated that it was informed by its Malaysian counterparts on 19 June 2024 that oil slicks had been observed off Johor. Ling stated that traces of oil had been found on the beaches at Sungai Rengit and at Teluk Ramunia, and about 1 km of Penerang's shoreline had been affected. Oil slicks had also been spotted off Pengerang. Cleanup operations began on 21 June 2024.

According to Malaysian news reports, about 200 fishermen at Sungai Rengit in Pengerang had been unable to go out to sea or fish as a result of the oil slicks since 16 June 2024.

=== Compensation ===
On 20 June 2024, the MPA stated that Singapore government agencies would seek compensation from the owners of Marine Honour in respect of costs incurred relating to the oil spill, including for measures taken to contain and clean up the spill, and any damage caused to infrastructure.

The MPA stated that the owners of the Marine Honour were liable under the International Convention on Civil Liability for Oil Pollution Damage 1969 (as revised in 1992), which is given effect to in Singapore by the Merchant Shipping (Civil Liability and Compensation for Oil Pollution) Act 1998.

The Marine Honour had insurance coverage in place addressing such liabilities, provided by insurer, British Marine.

On 23 June 2024, according to Malaysian news reports, Johor government requested Marine Honour to compensate affected fishermen.
