= Sisters' Islands Marine Park =

Marine park in Singapore

- Location within Singapore
- Type: Marine park
- Location: Sisters' Islands, Singapore
- Coordinates: 1°12′54″N 103°50′00″E
- Area: 400,000 m^{2} (40 hectares)
- Opened: August 2014; 12 years ago (Guided walks); 15 July 2015; 11 years ago (Public gallery); September 2015; 11 years ago (Dive trails)
- Operator: National Parks Board
- Status: Operational
- Website: Official site

Sisters’ Islands Marine Park is a 400,000 square metre(40ha) marine park located in Southern Islands planning area, Singapore, which was designated a marine protected area (MPA) by the Government of Maritime and Port Authority of Singapore in 2014. The park encompasses the land and waters surrounding Sisters' Islands, and also covers the western coasts of both St John's Island and Pulau Tekukor.

The park is Singapore's first marine park and it allows visitors to the park to experience the marine life around the region, through guided walks, the Marine Park Public Gallery and the dive trails where visitors can observe the marine life in the area.

== Overview ==
In July 2014, National Parks Board (NParks) announced their plans for a new marine park.

In 2017, during the debate on the Parks and Trees (Public Order Amendment Act 2017) Bill, the marine and foreshore areas of the islands were decided to be protected under the law, with the changes making it clear that the government also considers the areas as a type "public park" to be safeguarded.

=== Biodiversity ===
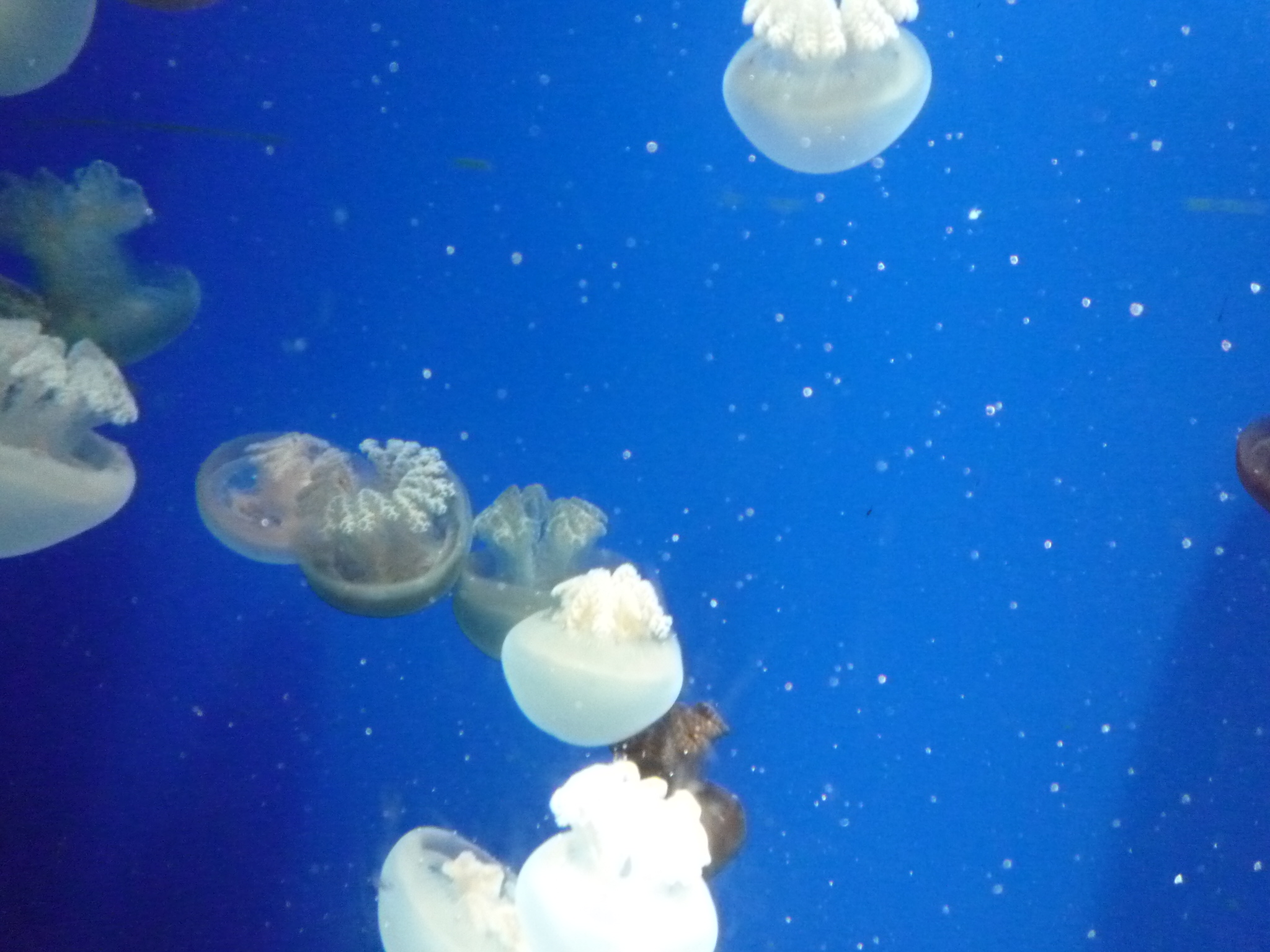
Southern Islands underwater panorama.

The area that the park occupies has a vast variety of marine life, which includes hard and soft corals, and sea anemones. The Sisters' Islands also house the local Long-tailed macaque.

Colonies of corals and sponges were also relocated from Pulau Semakau to the park. Among the sponges relocated were rare species like the Neptune's cup sponge (Cliona patera), which was thought to be extinct since 1908, until it was rediscovered in 2011 along Singapore's coast, precisely on Saint John's Island.

The Blue Plan was presented in 2009 under the auspices of the National Council of Social Service. The plan called for the protection of coral reefs and the creation of protected areas.

On 17 May 2018, a Coral Aquaculture project was jointly launched by JTC Corporation and NParks to support Singapore's Year of Climate Action 2018 and aid with coral reef restoration. The project involved the creation of 500 square metres of artificial reef area using concrete structures to support existing ecosynthesis and Coral reef protection efforts to conserve marine biodiversity. In November 2018, the first of eight structures was lowered to the sea floor. The 10-metre-tall (33 ft) structures, which stay on the seabed using their own weight, are made with concrete and fiberglass, and have a rough surface made with recycled rocks which allows organisms such as barnacles and shellfish to attach to the structure.

On 13 December 2020, in an update by NParks and the Friends of Marine Park community, it was announced that preliminary findings from a comprehensive biodiversity survey on the Southern Islands had discovered several rare and endangered species, including the hawksbill sea turtle (Eretmochelys imbricata), which had previously been recorded hatching their eggs on Sisters' Islands, the Oriental magpie-robin (Copsychus saularis), which was newly recorded on Pulau Tekukor, the spotted wood owl (Strix seloputo), which was recorded on the Sisters' Islands as well as the vulnerable and highly venomous Conus textile sea snail which was newly recorded on Lazarus Island that year. The update was given at the halfway mark of the two-year study, which covers the islands that make up Sisters' Islands Marine Park, including well known islands such as Sentosa Island, Semakau Island, as well as smaller and lesser-known islands such as Lazarus Island, Pulau Biola, Pulau Jong, and Pulau Keppel.

== Activities ==
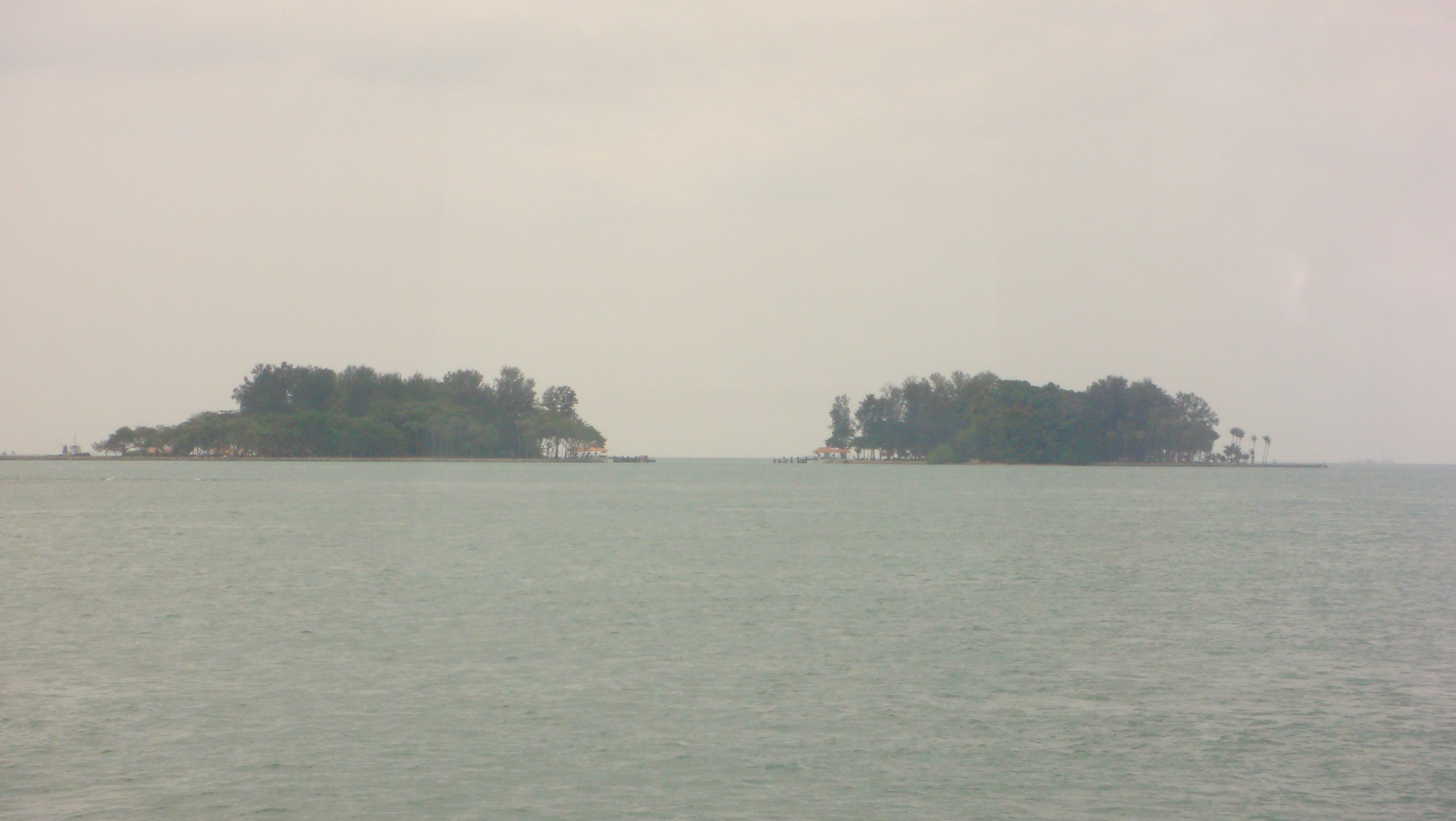
Sisters' Islands as seen from Saint John's Island, near Singapore Island.

=== Guided walks ===
Free guided walks are offered at low tides at the intertidal areas of Sisters’ Islands Marine Park, allowing the marine life in the area to be seen which is usually submerged under water. Nature guides will be at hand to bring visitors on a tour to experience the Marine Park's amazing biodiversity. Each guided walk session is open to a maximum of 45 people. The walks are currently limited to the shores off of the Sisters’ Islands.

=== Dive trails ===
Opened in September 2015, the park features 2 dive trails as part of the Marine Conservation Action Plan to protect and enhance marine heritage and biodiversity in the area. The two circular dive trails are located at different depths, the Shallow Dive Trail where divers can observe giant clams, sea anemones and clown fishes circles around coral reef and sandy habitats is around 4 to 6 metres underwater, while the Deep Dive Trail features coral rubble and rocky and silty habitats at around 10 to 16 metres deep where divers can observe sea fans, sea stars and the Neptune's cup sponge. Underwater signboards are also located along each dive trail provides information on marine biodiversity in the area.

There are also plans to build facilities in the big lagoon of Big Sister's island to allow access to intertidal areas.

=== Sisters' Islands Marine Park Public Gallery ===
The gallery, which is about 30 m^{2} (320 sq ft) was officially opened on 15 July 2015 by President Tony Tan Keng Yam. Features include a seminar room and teaching lab where talks, seminars and teaching activities for school and community groups can be facilitated at the park.

Plans to include viewing pools to display marine organisms and a mangrove ecosystem, which is an area where mangroves can be planted under controlled conditions to facilitate experiments for research projects, were set to be completed by 2016.

== See also ==
- List of parks in Singapore
