= Saint John's Island =

St John's Island Pulau Sekijang Bendera
- Island of Singapore
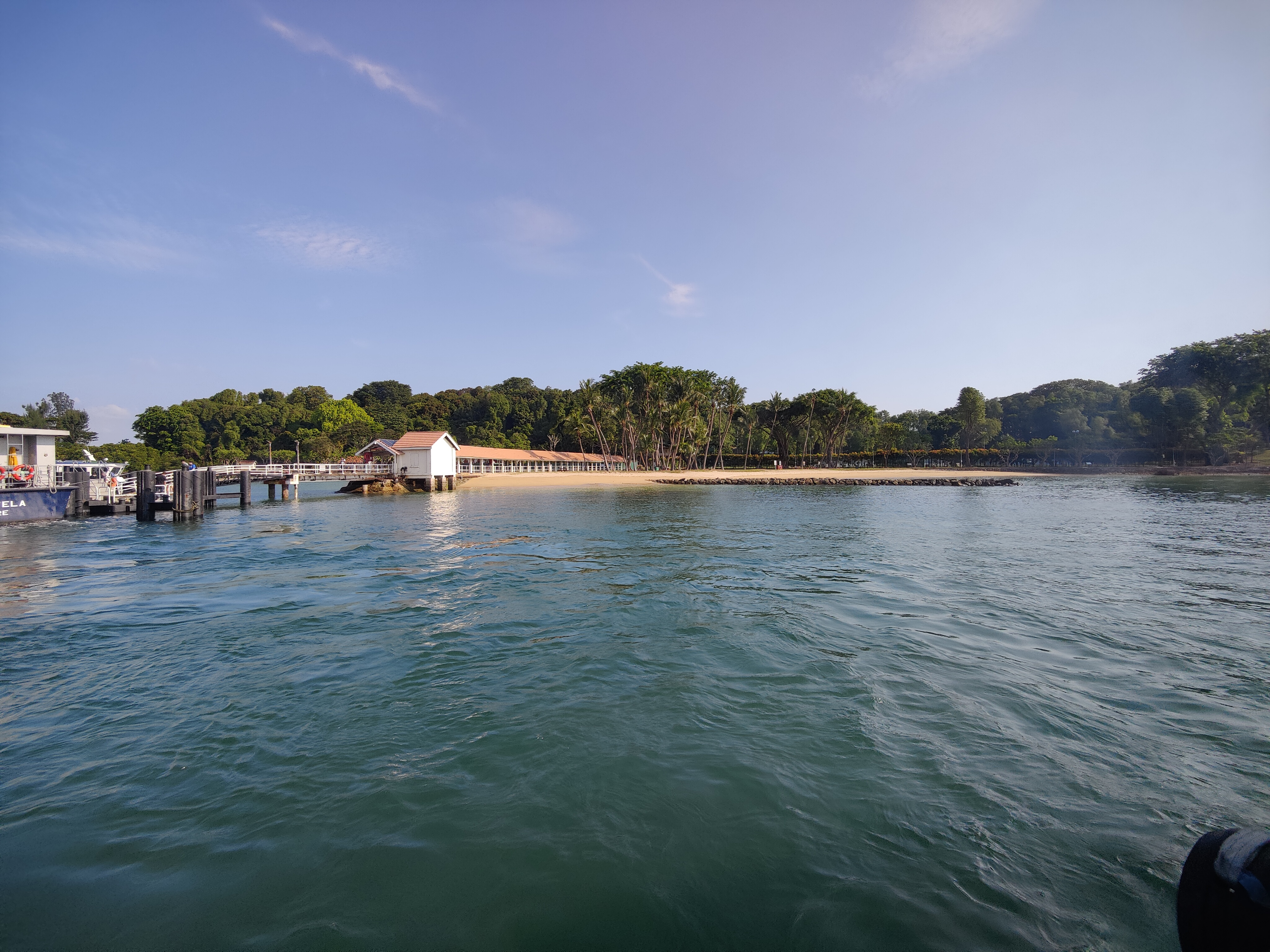

- Flag
- Location of St John's Island
- Coordinates: 1°13′08″N 103°50′53″E
- Country: Singapore
- British settlement founded in Singapore: 1819
- Singapore islands ceded to British: 1824
- Singapore sovereign over St John's Island: 1959

Government
  - Body: Government of Singapore

Area
  - Total: 0.41 km^{2} (0.16 sq mi)

Saint John's Island (Chinese: 圣约翰岛; pinyin: Shèngyuēhàndǎo Malay: Pulau Sekijang Bendera), also known as St John's, is an island in the Straits of Singapore located 6.5 km off the southern coast of Singapore. With an area of 0.41 km^{2} (0.16 sq mi), it is the largest of the Marine Park islands which also include the Sisters' Islands and Pulau Tekukor. St John's was colonised by the British along with mainland Singapore in the 19th century and was the site of a colonial quarantine centre. In the 20th century, the island served as a detention centre, drug rehabilitation centre and refugee settlement. Singapore gained independence under the Government of Singapore in the mid-20th century and maintained sovereignty over St John's. In the present day, the island has doubled as grounds for recreational facilities and aquaculture research and development facilities.

The island is part of the Jurong Rock Formation and contains both tropical rainforest and coastal habitats, and is one of the wetlands of Singapore. It is populated by several nationally critically endangered species of plants and animals. Currently, the island has no permanent inhabitants.

== Etymology ==
St John's Island was originally named Sekijang (also known as Sakijang), which combines two Malay words, si and kijang; si means either 'barking,' 'one' or 'roe'; kijang means 'deer'. According to a member of the Stamford Raffles British delegation, John Crawfurd, they had misinterpreted the island's local name as 'St John' during their attempt to establish a port in the neighboring island of Singapore in 1819.

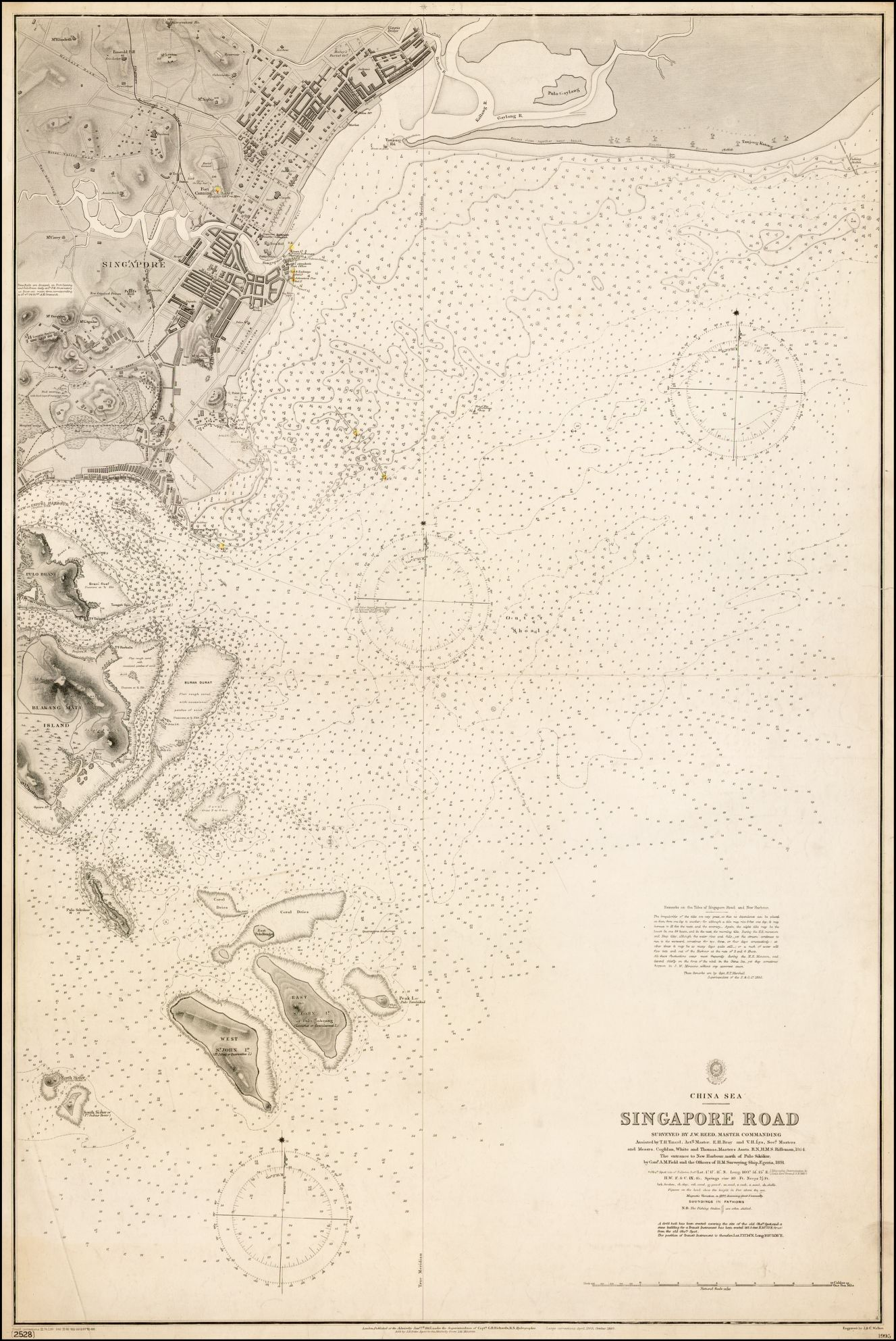
1892 edition of a British Admiralty chart of Singapore Harbor (1864) depicting mainland Singapore and East and West St John's.

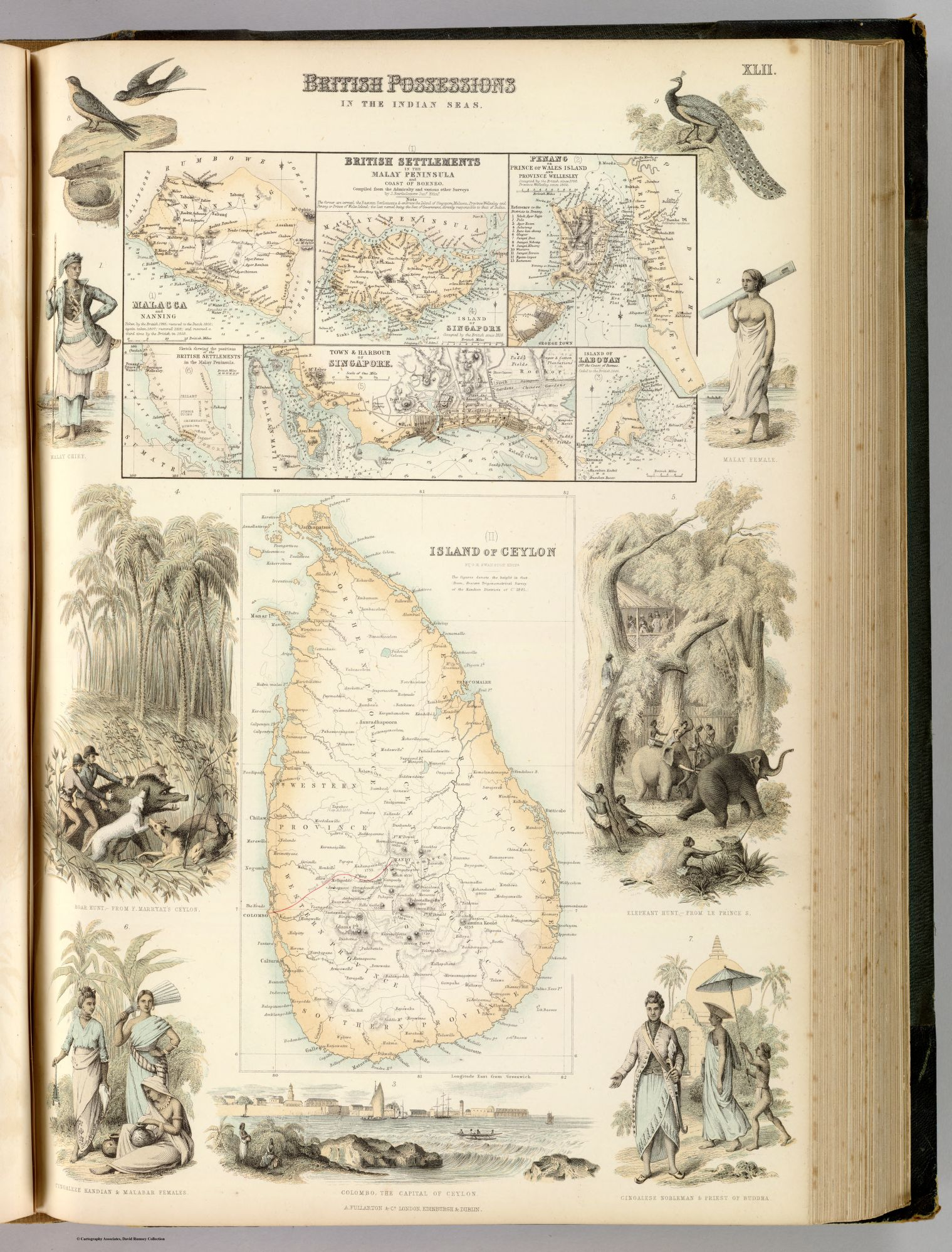
1872 map of British colonies in the Indian Seas depicting Malaya, Singapore, Borneo, and Ceylon

St John's Island and the neighbouring Lazarus Island were once collectively known by the shared Malay name Sekijang and English name 'St John's'. In maps like the 1892 British Admiralty chart of Singapore Harbor, St John's and Lazarus Island were distinguished as West and East St John's, or St John's no. 2 and no. 1 respectively. In other maps like 1872 British Possessions In The Indian Seas, St John's was named 'Sikajang Island' and Lazarus Island was labelled 'St John's Island'. Eventually, St John's Island's Malay name became Sekijang Bendera, with the term Bendera meaning flag in Malay, which is attributed to a flagstaff that existed on the island from 1823 to 1833. East St John's was later officially renamed 'Lazarus Island', also known as 'Convalescent Island', after a beriberi hospital was built there in 1899. Lazarus Island is now known as Pulau Sekijang Pelepah in Malay, with pelepah meaning 'palm leaves'.

The original Chinese name of St John's is Qizhangshan (Chinese: 棋樟山; pinyin: Qízhāngshān), meaning Mount Qizhang, which refers to a hill at the centre of the island. It is a transliteration of sekijang. Its Chinese name was later officially replaced with a translation of its English name, 'St John's Island' (Chinese: 圣约翰岛; pinyin: Shèngyuēhàndǎo).

== History ==
=== Early colonial history ===
On 28 January 1819, a delegation led by colonial official Sir Stamford Raffles anchored off St John's, a day before they arrived at mainland Singapore to establish a British trading port. After the port was established that year, a signal station was constructed on St John's Island, along with a signal flagstaff. The signal station informed passing ships in the Straits of Singapore of the new port. It was also tasked to operate the flagstaff to report ship sightings to the signal post on Government Hill in mainland Singapore. (Note: Not to be confused with the Kusu Island (formerly named Goa Island or Peak Island) flagstaff that was transferred to the "highest peak of [east] St. John's" in February 1823. An 1830 hydrographic map by David Ross clarifies that the Kusu Island flagstaff was moved specifically to the eastern island of the St John's Islands, also known as Lazarus Island.)

By 1830, the facilities on St John's Island, including the flagstaff, were reported by the officer in charge of public works to be in a dilapidated state. They were not repaired because the government did not plan to continue the St John's signal station. The flagstaff on St John's was moved to Mount Faber in 1833. Visitors to the island in subsequent years such as naturalist George Bennett and Dr Robert Little found it to be virtually abandoned, with only one Malay inhabitant.

=== Quarantine centre ===
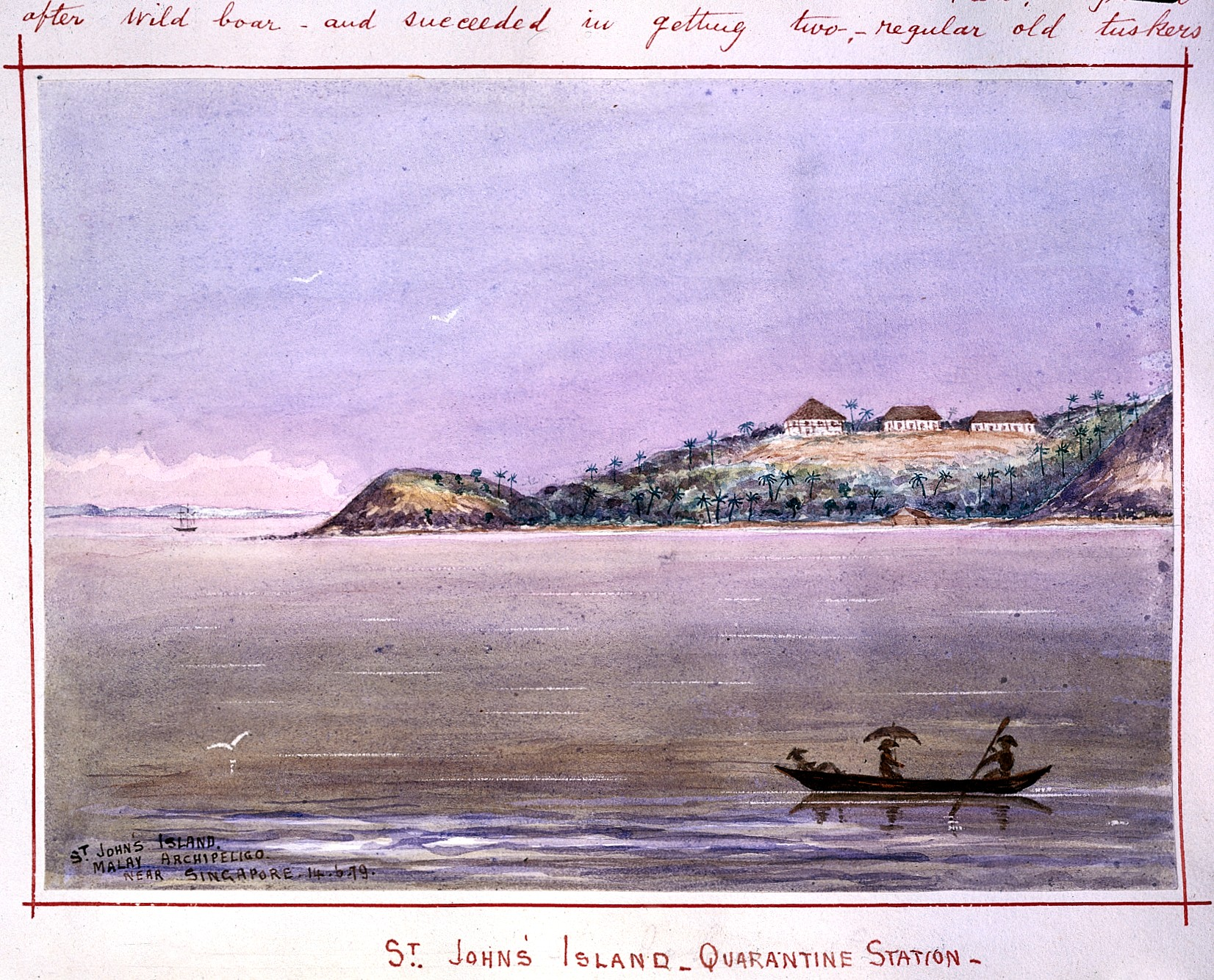
Watercolour painting of St John's Island Quarantine Centre by John Edmund Taylor in 1879

As the number of immigrants to Singapore increased from the late 19th century onwards, the risk of epidemics heightened, leading to the establishment of a Quarantine Centre on St John's. Initially, the Quarantine Ordinance (No. 7 of 1868) was implemented to prohibit all infected ships from docking at port. However, in July 1873, a boat from Bangkok caused a cholera epidemic that lasted two months and resulted in 857 infections and 448 deaths, despite the orders of Governor Harry Ord to quarantine all ships from Siam. Consequently, Acting Master Attendant Henry Ellis proposed that a quarantine station be constructed on St John's Island. Governor Harry Ord officially approved the proposal in a speech at the Legislative Council on 21 March 1874.

The St John's Island quarantine station opened in November 1874 and served not just immigrants to Singapore but also Muslims returning to Malaya after their pilgrimage to Mecca. Although Ellis had plans for a police ship, a hospital on St John's, a steam cutter, and a cemetery on Kusu Island to support the quarantine station, it consisted largely of attap huts when first completed. The month it opened, the station quarantined more than 1,000 Chinese passengers on the cholera-infected SS Milton which was travelling from Swatow to the British colonies Penang and Province Wellesley. In 1890, Muslims on the Queen Margaret who were returning after their Hajj pilgrimage were quarantined on St John's. In 1894, the Hong Kong outbreak of bubonic plague prompted the Quarantine Station to prepare to receive bubonic plague victims. A plague hospital was constructed and ships were inspected, with one case of bubonic plague caught in March 1896.

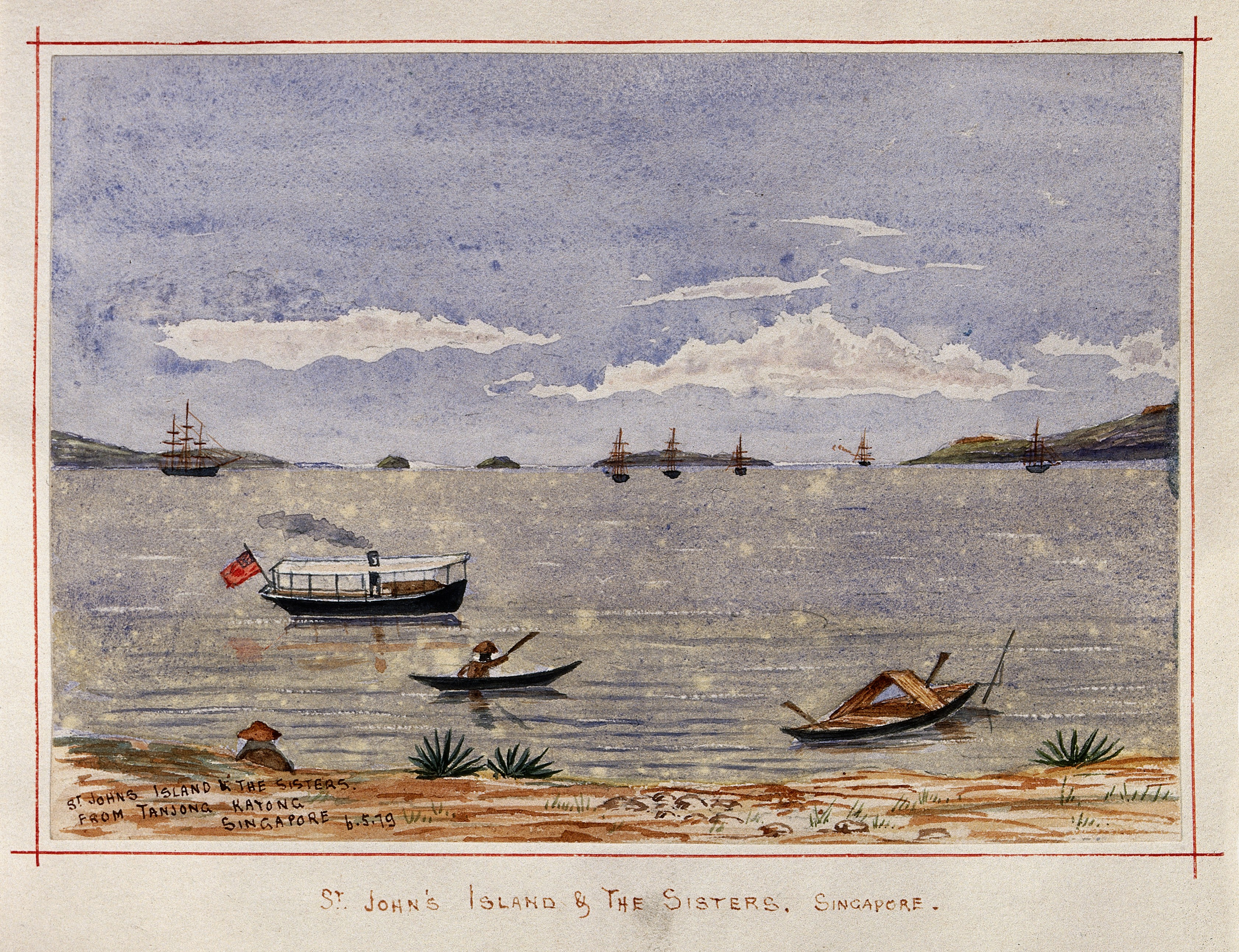
Watercolour painting of St John's and Sisters' Island from Tanjong Katong in 1879, by John Edmund Taylor

Aside from the addition of the plague hospital, more facilities were added when the station was further redeveloped. From 1903 onwards, more than 300,000 dollars was spent on the station's development. New facilities included muster sheds for passengers to disinfect and change clothes, and boiler houses for disinfecting belongings. Other facilities include a coroner's court; a police station, jail and Sikh police barracks; a post office; storehouses of loose sulphur for fumigating ships; a temple and a mosque; quarters for workers. Additionally, a burial ground for the quarantine station's deceased was sited on Lazarus Island.

The improved facilities came in time to also serve as emergency accommodations in 1911 for the rising number of beriberi victims in the late 1890s and early 1900s. In August 1911, the overflow patients and beriberi victims in Tan Tock Seng Hospital were quarantined on St John's as one of the beriberi patients had been infected by a cholera outbreak.

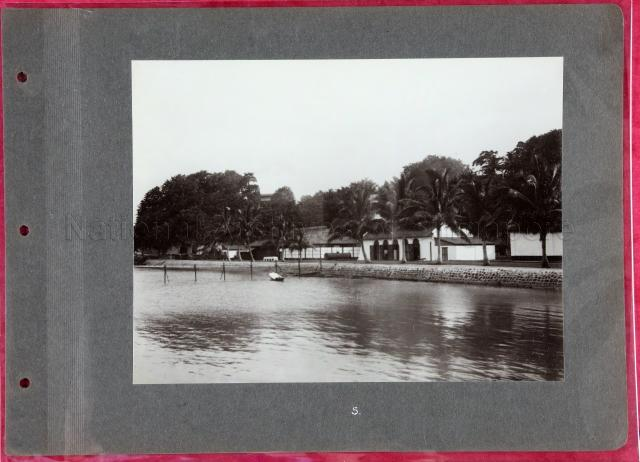
Photograph of disinfection buildings at the Quarantine Centre on St John's Island, Singapore, in 1930.

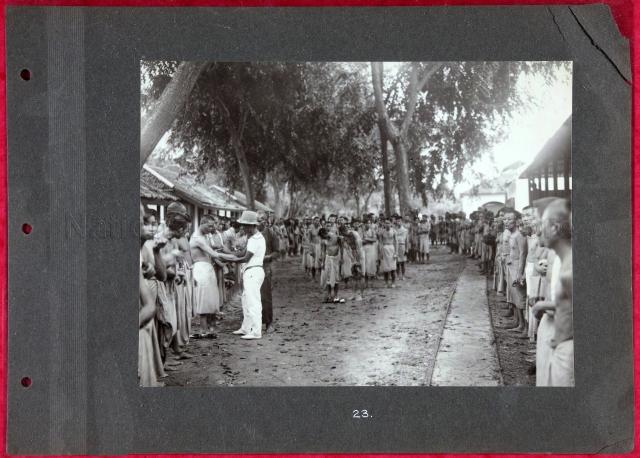
Photo of vaccination of male passengers at the Quarantine Centre on St John's Island, Singapore.

In the early 20th century, the quarantine centre was further equipped and had become one of the largest quarantine operations in the British Empire. By 1924, the St John's Island quarantine station had a maximum capacity of 6,000 people. Between 1903 and 1923, the station inspected approximately 8 million people and quarantined 300,000. A model of the quarantine station was featured at the Malaya Pavilion at the British Empire Exhibition held in Wembley in April 1924. By 1930, the quarantine station was capable of vaccination and was equipped with a dispensary, telephone wires, and disinfection buildings with Izal solution spray.

Despite the quarantine laws and the island's treatment facilities, not all passengers were quarantined nor received the same level of care due to classism. Unlike steerage class passengers, cabin class (first and second-class) passengers were not required to undergo quarantine. Health examinations for sailors were also less demanding. By contrast, Chinese coolies were allegedly provided insufficient food, no bedding and used as forced labour. Complaints were made to no avail.

The St John's quarantine station officially closed on 14 January 1976 because the popularisation of air travel had drastically reduced the number of arrivals by boat.

=== Detention centre ===
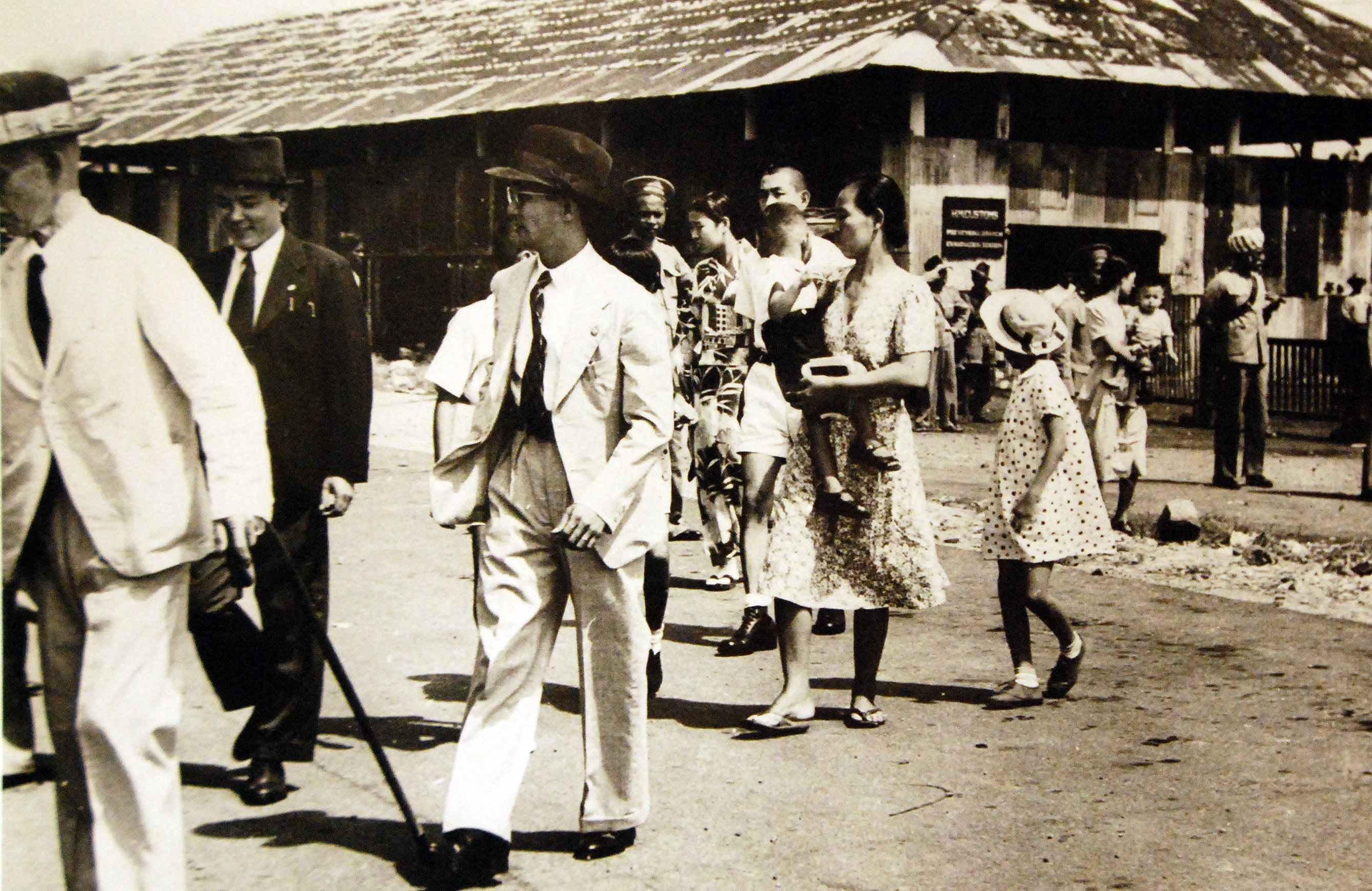
Custom barriers where six-hundred Japanese leave Singapore in WWII

St John's Island served as a World War I and World War II internment camp. In August 1914, right after World War I began, most German men in Singapore were interned on St John's Island and Tanglin Barracks while women and children were detained in Kuala Lumpur. Enemy combatants were also imprisoned on the island, including the crew of SS Markomannia and the Greek collier SS Pontoporos, which was captured by the Germans. By 1916, a total of 296 enemy nationals had been transferred from St John's to Australia . During World War II (1939–1945), enemy foreign nationals—some of whom were fleeing Nazism—were interned at St John's Island in 1940. Of these, the Germans who were to be removed from the war were interned in Ceylon. As for the rest, some were deported to neutral grounds like Shanghai. Others were transported to Australia, including German-Jewish Werner Baer (musician) and his family. Separately, the Japanese subsequently allied with the Germans and invaded Malaya. Shortly after, the Japanese women and children in Singapore were also interned on St John's Island from late 1941 to 1942 before being shipped to Calcutta. When the Japanese occupation of Malaya during World War II began, Allied prisoners of war were detained on St John's.

The Malayan Emergency (1948–1960) sparked by the Communist Party of Malaya caused St John's to resume operating as a detention centre for political prisoners. In 1947, the Communist Party of Malaya initiated a guerilla war against the British colonial government in hopes that it would be more effective in turning the Federation of Malaya and the Crown Colony of Singapore communist. Fatal attacks committed in the Federation of Malaya in June 1948 as part of this war culminated in the British colonial government declaring a state of emergency, thus enacting the Essential Regulations Proclamation on 24 June. This granted the government the authority to arrest and detain anyone without trial. Expecting an influx of political prisoners, St John's Island was officially announced as the site of the new detention centre on 3 July 1948 and became a protected area from 10 September onward.

St John's housed not only communists but also political suspects and detainees of other political leanings, from both Malaya and Singapore, who sought to overthrow the colonial government. St John's received its first batch of detainees on 20 September 1948, comprising 200 political prisoners from Johore Bahru. Travellers via ship suspected of communist inclinations were also detained at St John's under the Emergency Travel Restrictions Regulations until they were cleared of suspicion. Within two years, more than 600 were detained under the Emergency Regulations, most of whom were held on St John's. Singaporean political prisoners detained on St John's Island were university students, teachers, newspaper editors, several future politicians of Singapore, and others. Among the detainees were Devan Nair, Fong Swee Suan and Lim Chin Siong, all People's Action Party (PAP) members. They were released in 1959 after Singapore was granted full internal self-government and the PAP won the 1959 Singapore general election.

The state's fear of communism did not abide, resulting in St John's being used as a detention centre for most of the detainees arrested during the anti-communist Operation Coldstore. On 2 February 1963, the Internal Security Council of the Singapore Government executed Operation Coldstore, which detained those charged as political extremists under the Preservation of Public Security Ordinance. Arrestees were detained without trial, some for being a "suspected communist" or for associating with them. The state justifies Operation Coldstore as a response to communist threats. Prior to the move to St John's, the detainees were held in Outram Prison. On 6 February, it was announced that 99 of the 113 Operation Coldstore detainees were to be moved to the island. The rest were citizens of the Federation of Malaya, who were to be expatriated. The operation has been a contentious subject of criticism, such as from ex-detainee Poh Soo Kai and historian Thum Ping Tjin who claim that Operation Coldstore was a pretext for the PAP to crush political opposition.

=== Drug rehabilitation centres ===
From 1945 onwards, the British sought to curb opium addiction in Singapore and this led to the establishment of St John's Opium Treatment Centre. Opium was prevalent in Singapore with more than 16,000 addicts recorded after World War II. By 1945, the British Administration of Malaya sought to curb its effects and banned opium in its colonies in October. The following year, the Opium and Chandu Proclamation further restricted drug activity by banning opium smoking and the possession of opium-smoking devices. Despite these regulations, there were still more than 1,400 opium dens in 1949.

In the 1950s, the government tackled drug activity more aggressively through legal means, vice operations, and the establishment of an Opium Treatment Centre on St John's. They revised the Dangerous Drugs Ordinance of 1951 in 1953 to increase their authority to prosecute opium-related crimes, and initiated vice operations, such as the major opium crackdown of 1952. The Opium Treatment Centre was established under an amendment to the Dangerous Drugs Ordinance in 1954, marking the colonial government's first attempt to rehabilitate addicts. Formerly, addicts were simply imprisoned. Institutions have previously attempted to rehabilitate addicts, but only a fraction of patients were permanently cured.

The centre opened in February 1955 and was managed by the Prisons Department. The opium treatment programme had three phases: withdrawal, rehabilitation and follow-up. Gradual withdrawal from opium typically lasted two to four weeks in the prison hospital. The subsequent rehabilitation phase would last six months to a year at the Opium Treatment Centre on St John's Island, during which patients were taught new skills such as carpentry to aid future reintegration into society.

The experimental opium rehabilitation programme was noteworthy for medical institutions and was later claimed to cure the majority of those admitted; however, its criteria of admittance were controversial. During the centre's opening, the Commissioner of Prisons Major Sochon claimed that the United Nations Organisation had taken note. It was also claimed by the Singapore Free Press that only six of about 400 addicts treated within two years of its opening had relapsed. By 1966, more than 4,000 opium addicts had been rehabilitated at the centre. However, the apparent success of the centre must be prefaced by their denial of treatment to long-time addicts whom they evaluated to be incurable.

By the 1970s, opium addiction had greatly declined, although the extent to which this success can be attributed to the treatment centre is unknown. Despite the decline in opium addiction specifically, the number of arrests due to drug offences, in general, had increased between 1971 and 1973.

In response to the increasing number of drug offenses in Singapore, in 1973, the government converted the Opium Treatment Centre to a Drug Rehabilitation Centre for treating all types of drug addicts, especially young adults. This rehabilitation centre was shut down in 1975 as the island was to be redeveloped by the Sentosa Development Corporation into a resort centre.

=== Temporary settlement for refugees ===
St John's Island was also a temporary settlement for refugees in the 20th century. In 1955, the quarantine station housed residents of Lazarus Island, after a rare high tide destroyed their homes. In the mid-1970s, the rehabilitating drug addicts were temporarily moved out when eighty-four Vietnam War (1955–1975) refugees were settled on the island. The final batch of Vietnamese refugees departed for a permanent host country in late 1975. In 1998, there was a rise in arrests of illegal immigrants and overstayers after the 1997 Asian Financial Crisis, and the government was anticipating a mass of Indonesian refugees after the May 1998 riots of Indonesia. From January to July 1998, there was an increase of almost 2000 illegal immigrants and 1000 overstayers arrested compared to the whole of last year. However, this may be due to more police raids and patrols targeting illegal immigrants. By June, there were fears that the mainland prisons' capacity would be insufficient. Thus, the government began constructing a temporary Prison Detention Centre on St John's Island to house potential spill over illegal immigrants and drug addicts. However, the expected influx of Indonesian refugees did not occur, and the temporary detention centre stands abandoned.

=== Holiday camp and aquaculture research centres ===
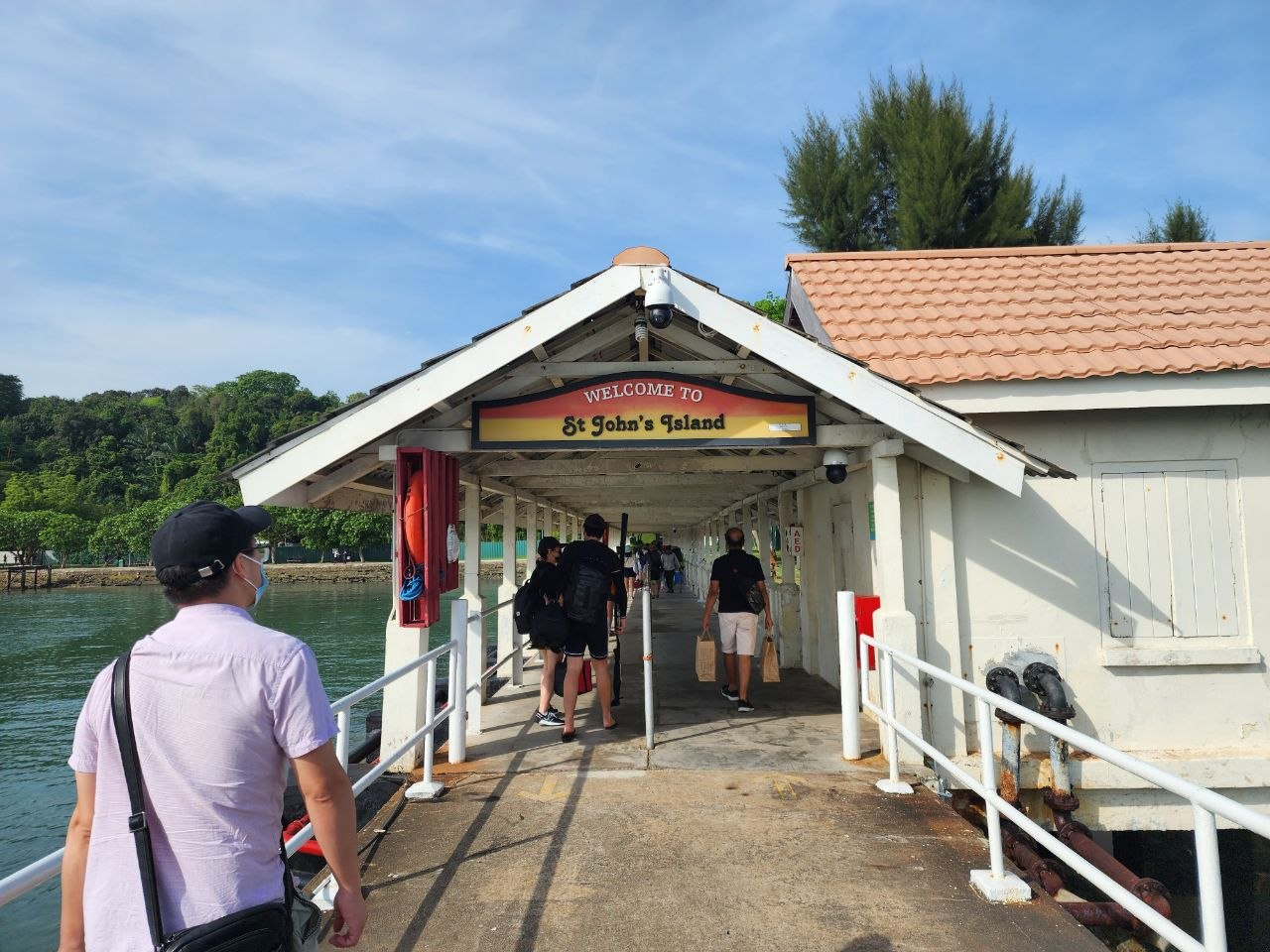
St John's Island Pier in 2023

In the mid-1970s, the Sentosa Development Corporation planned to redevelop Singapore's offshore islands into resort centres. However, proposals to redevelop St John's as a holiday island with restaurants, golf courses and an integrated resort-casino fell through. Instead, the 3 million dollar budget was spent on developing a holiday camp on the island with sports and games facilities. A three-day outdoor activities camp for schools was established on the island in 1975.

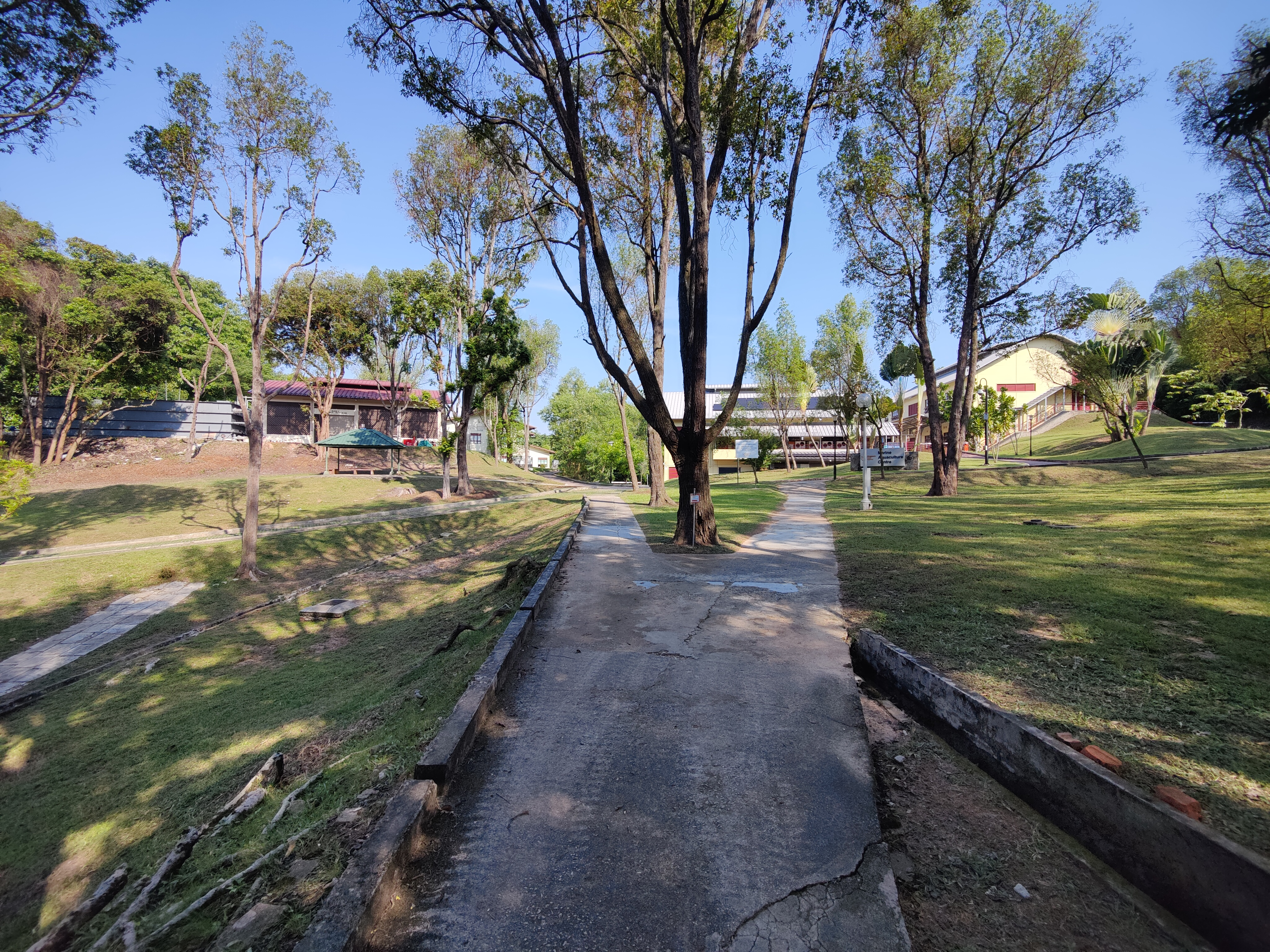
The Marine Aquaculture Centre (MAC) (right) and the National Marine Laboratory (left)

St John's Island is currently the site of several aquaculture research and development facilities. The Marine Aquaculture Centre (MAC) is a hatchery completed in June 2003, and the National Marine Laboratory was established in 2002.

In April 2018, traces of asbestos was found in construction debris around the island's campsite, lagoon and holiday bungalow areas. The two long-term residents on the island were evacuated and were assessed to be healthy. Access to the island was restricted while the contaminated debris was being removed.

== Geography ==
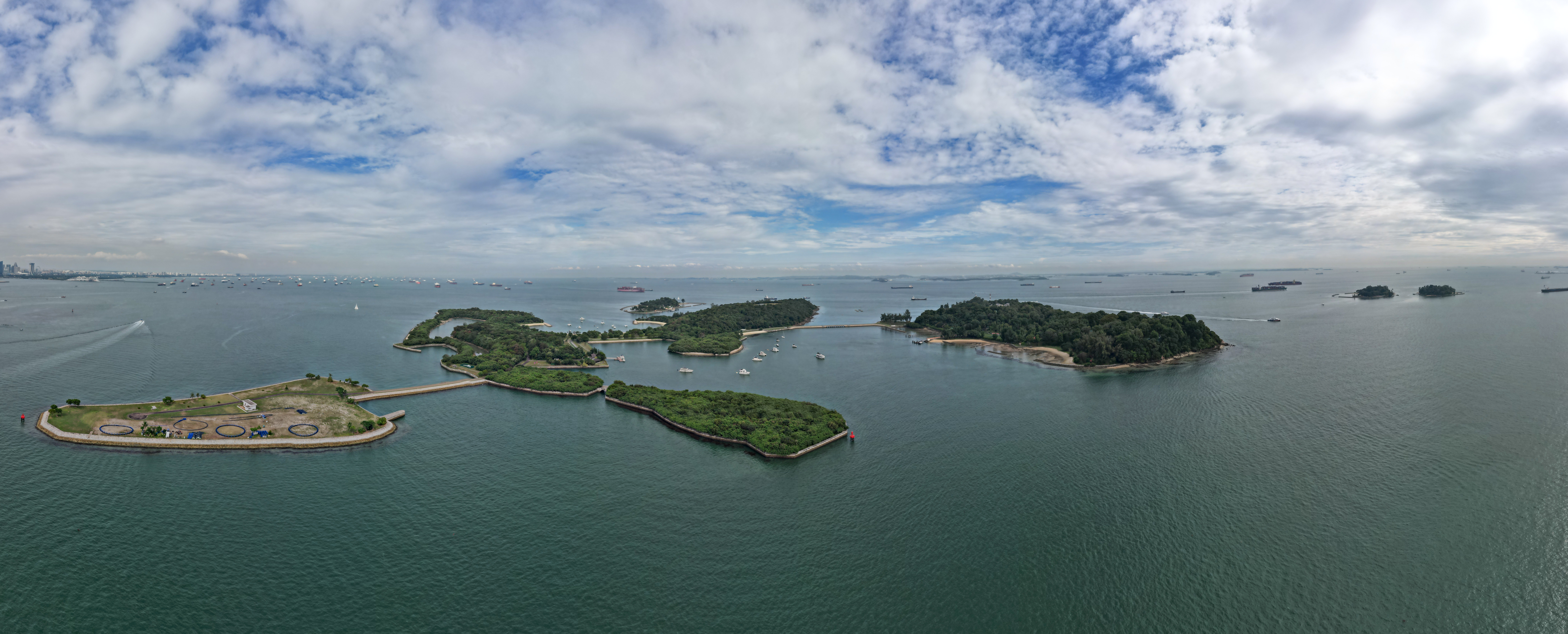
Panorama of St John's Island (right) in 2022

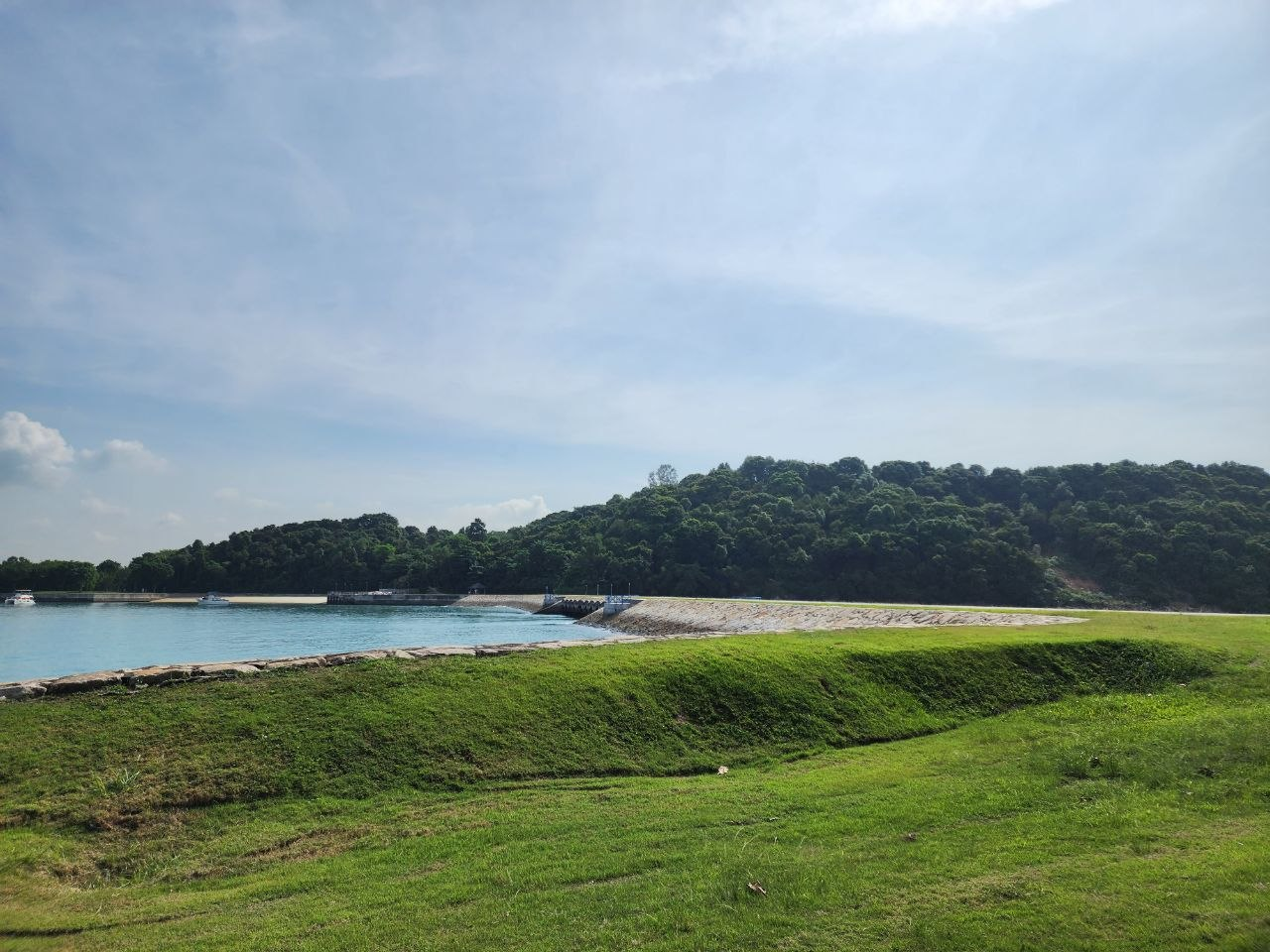
St John's Island - Lazarus Causeway in 2023

St John's Island has a land area of 41.23 km^{2} (15.92 sq mi) and is located in the Strait of Singapore, about 6.5 km from the southern coast of mainland Singapore. Its location is at longitude 1°13′08.30″N and latitude 103°50′53.88″E. All the Southern Islands, including St John's, are formed by the Triassic rocks of the Jurong Formation. St John's Island's original area of 33.59 km^{2} (12.97 sq mi) was expanded by 7.64 km^{2} (2.95 sq mi) through land reclamation in the 1970s. In 2006, Lazarus Island and Seringat Island were merged and then connected to St John's via a causeway. St John's coastline comprises sandy beaches, quarry rocks to prevent erosion, lagoons, cliffs, and mangrove swamps. Like Singapore, St John's has an equatorial climate with rainfall throughout the year, especially during the first half of the Northeast Monsoon.

In 2020, restricted access to the protected lagoon, Bendera Bay, was opened to the public via programmes.

== Biodiversity ==
The island's tropical forest and marine habitats are home to crustaceans and cetaceans in the Singapore Strait and land animals. The island is also surrounded by coral reefs. The nationally critically endangered Asian Drongo Cuckoo can be found on the island, as well as nesting grounds of the critically endangered Hawksbill Turtle.

St John's Island is covered by natural vegetation (32.0%), the majority of which is managed coastal vegetation (60.6%). More than 258 species of vascular plants have been recorded on the island, including several nationally critically endangered species such as the Podocarpus Polystachyus R Br (Sea Teak) and the Xylocarpus rumphii (Meliaceae).

The Sentosa Development Regulations (1997) were implemented to protect the biodiversity of Singapore's offshore islands. Among other regulations, it prohibits killing or capturing any animal, bird, insect, or plant.

== Demographics ==
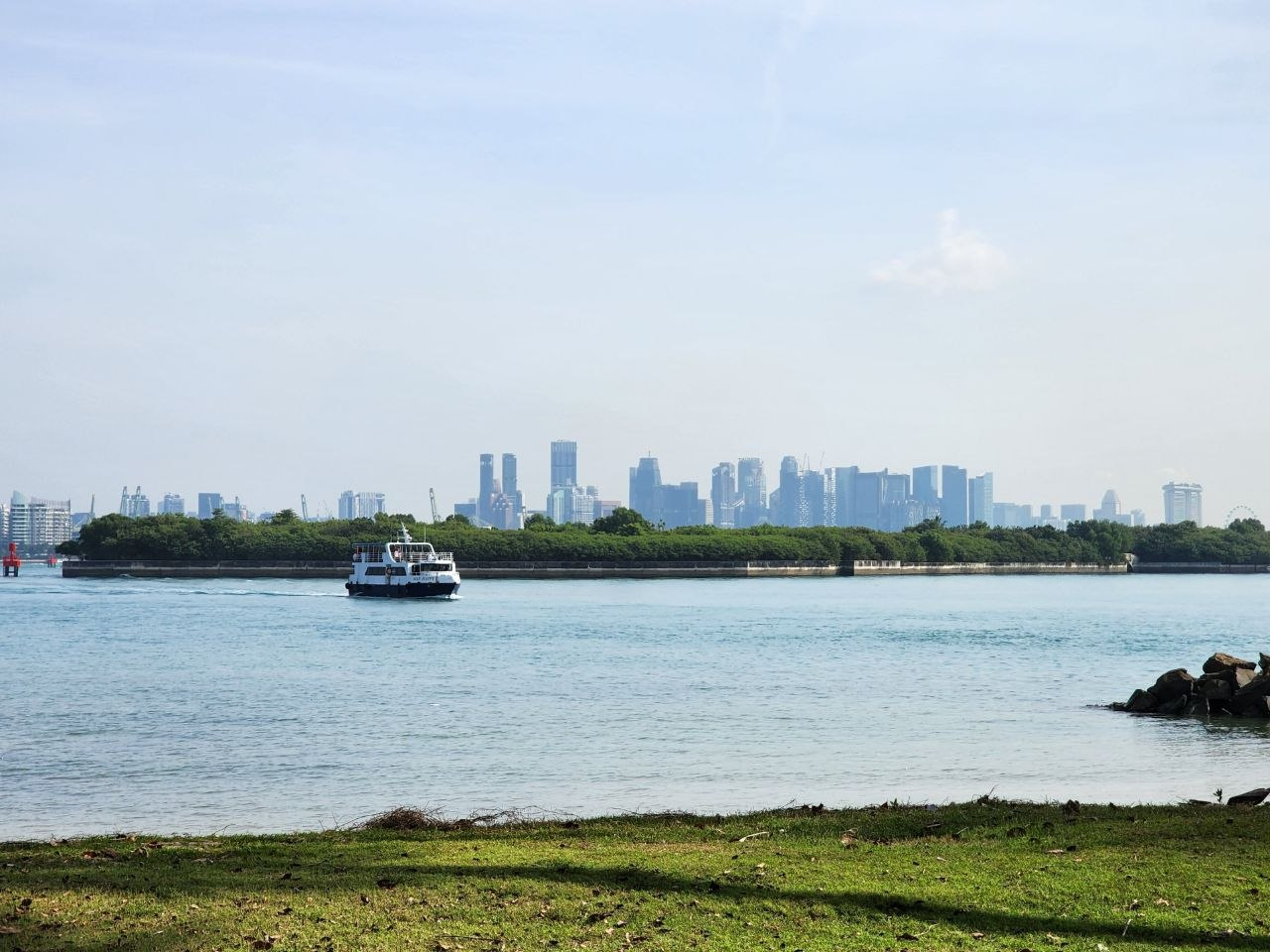
View of Singapore from St John's Island in 2023

From 1962 to 1963, there were more than 400 islanders. Between 1976 and 1977, the residents of St John's Island, Lazarus Island and Seringat Island were relocated to the mainland, and the remaining four permanent islanders on St John's left in 2017. St John's Island English Primary School, the only school on the island, was shut down in 1976. St John's Island currently has no permanent residents.

== Bibliography ==
- Bennett, George (1834). Wanderings in New South Wales, Batavia, Petir Coast, Singapore, and China: Being the journal of a naturalist in those countries during 1832, 1833 and 1834. Vol. 2. London: Richard Bentley.
- Corbett, Julian Stafford (1920). Naval Operations. History of the Great War based on official documents by direction of the Historical Section of the Committee of Imperial Defence. Vol. 1: To the Battle of the Falklands. London; New York: Longmans, Green and Co.
- Dümling, Albrecht (28 April 2020). "City Organist, Teacher and Entertainer: The Multi-Talented Werner Baer in Singapore, 1939–1940". In Steinberg, Swen; Grenville, Anthony (eds.). Refugees from Nazi-occupied Europe in British Overseas Territories. Oxford University Press.
- Hack, Karl (2012). "Framing Singapore's History". In Tarling, Nicholas (ed.). Studying Singapore's Past: C.M. Turnbull and the History of Modern Singapore. NUS Press.
- Hack, Karl (December 2021). The Malayan Emergency: revolution and counterinsurgency at the end of empire. Cambridge, United Kingdom: Cambridge University Press. doi:10.1017/9781139942515. ISBN 978-1-139-94251-5. OCLC 1275433029.
- Kennedy, Joseph (1989). When Singapore Fell: Evacuations and Escapes, 1941–42. Palgrave Macmillan. doi:10.1007/978-1-349-20363-5. ISBN 978-1-349-20365-9.
- Koh, Tommy; Auger, Timothy; Ng, Wei Chian; Yap, Jimmy, eds. (11 September 2006). "Pulau Sekijang Bendera". Singapore: The Encyclopedia. Singapore: Editions Didier Millet. ISBN 981-4155-63-2.
- Lee, Yong Kiat (1977). Quarantine in Early Singapore. Singapore: Stamford College Press.
- Lee, Yong Kiat (1978). The Medical History of Early Singapore. Tokyo: Southeast Asian Medical Information Center.
- Makepeace, Walter; Brooke, Gilbert E.; Braddell, Roland St. J. (1991). One Hundred Years of Singapore. Singapore: Oxford University Press.
- Manz, Stefan; Panayi, Panikos (27 February 2020). Enemies in the Empire: Civilian Internment in the British Empire during the First World War. Oxford University Press.
- Manz, Stefan; Panayi, Panikos (10 October 2018). "The internment of civilian 'enemy aliens' in the British Empire". In Manz, Stefan; Panayi, Panikos; Stibbe, Matthew (eds.). Internment during the First World War: A Mass Global Phenomenon. Routledge.
- Monteath, Peter (28 April 2020). Captured Lives: Australia's Wartime Internment Camps. Oxford University Press.
- Narayanan, Ganesan (October 2005). Realism and Interdependence in Singapore's Foreign Policy. Routledge.
- Savage, V. R.; Yeoh, B.S.A. (2013). Singapore Street Names: A Study of Toponymics. Singapore: Marshall Cavendish Editions.
- Singapore Facts and Pictures, 1981. Singapore: Ministry of Culture. 1981.
- Sham, Desmond Hok-Man (2022). "Beyond a Racialized Representation of Colonial Quarantine". In Huang, Shu-Mei; Lee, Hyun Kyung; Vickers, Edward (eds.). Frontiers of Memory in the Asia-Pacific: Difficult Heritage and the Transnational Politics of Postcolonial Nationalism. Hong Kong University Press.
- Teo, Delia; Liew, Clement (2003). Guardians of Our Homeland: the Heritage of Immigration & Checkpoints Authority. Singapore: Immigration & Checkpoints Authority. ISBN 981-05-0860-3.
- Davidson, G. W. H.; Ng, P.K.L; Chew, Ho Hua, eds. (1994). The Singapore Red Databook: Threatened Plants & Animals of Singapore. Singapore: Nature Society (Singapore).
