= Southern Islands =

Group of islands and planning area in Singapore

- Planning Area

Other transcription(s)
  - Chinese: 南部群岛
  - Pinyin: Nánbù qúndǎo
  - Malay: Kepulauan Selatan
  - Tamil: தெற்கு தீவுகள்
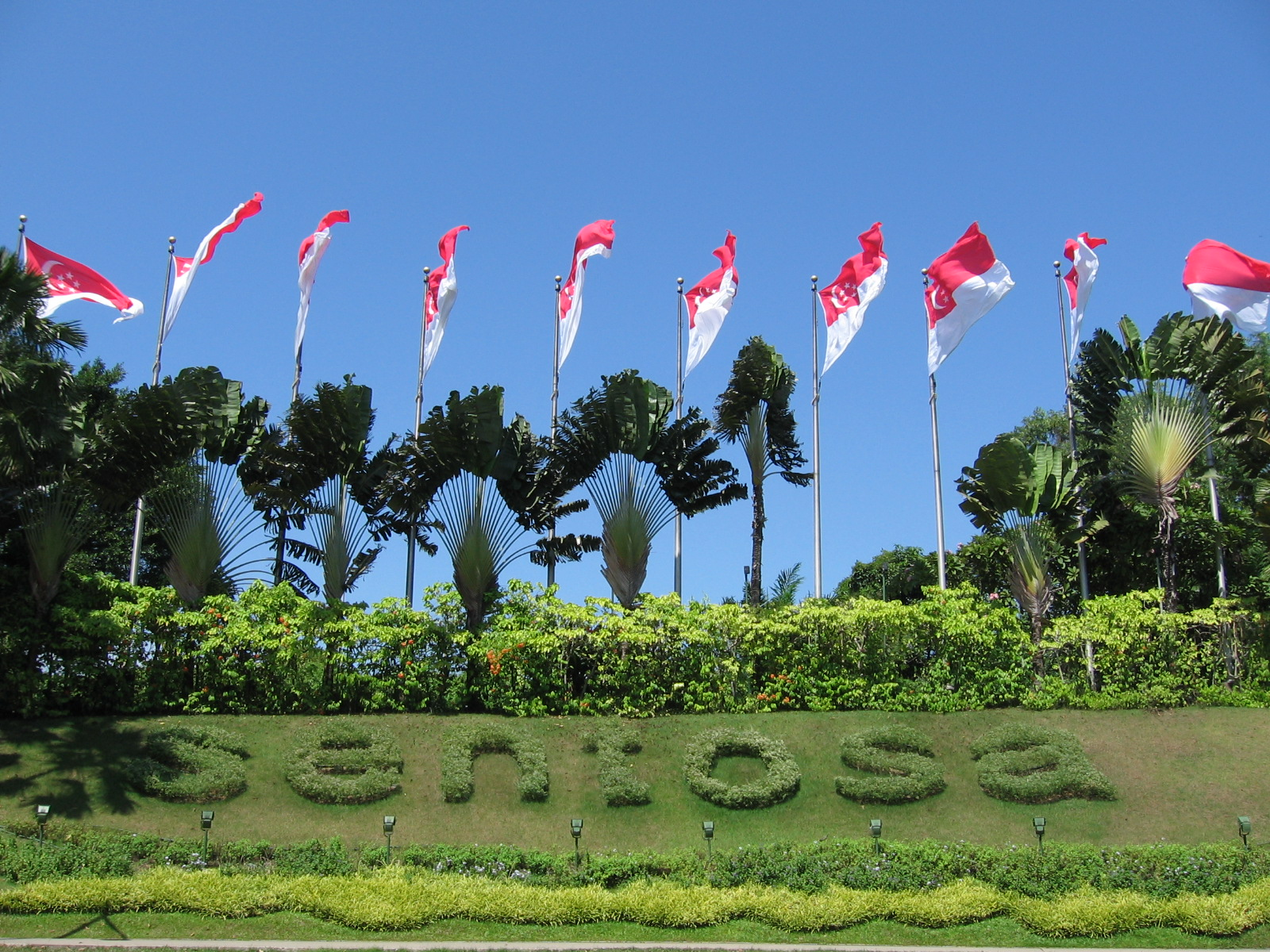
- Sentosa, one of the eight major islands and the largest of the Southern Islands, has been developed into a major tourist attraction in Singapore.

- Location in Central Region

- Location within Singapore
- Country: Singapore
- Region: Central
- CDCs: Central Singapore CDC
- Town councils: Tanjong Pagar Town Council
- Constituencies: Radin Mas SMC

Government
  - Mayor: Central Singapore CDC: Denise Phua
  - Members of Parliament: Radin Mas SMC: Melvin Yong

Area
  - Total: 7.13 km^{2} (2.75 sq mi)
  - Rank: 41 out of 55

Population (2026)
  - Total: 2,840
  - Density: 398/km^{2} (1,030/sq mi)

Ethnic Groups
  - Chinese: 1,010
  - Malays: 30
  - Indians: 200
  - Others: 700

The Southern Islands is a planning area consisting of a collection of islets located within the Central Region of Singapore, once home to the native Malay islanders and indigenous Orang Laut sea nomad tribes before they were relocated to the mainland for urban redevelopment and future use. The islands that form the planning area are Kusu Island, Lazarus Island, Pulau Seringat, Pulau Tekukor, Saint John's Island, Sentosa and the two Sisters' Islands. The islands encompass a total land area of about 5.58 square kilometres (2.15 sq mi). The Sentosa Development Corporation oversaw the development and maintenance of these offshore islands south of Singapore from 1976 to March 2017, when it handed it back to the Singapore Land Authority.

The Southern Islands planning area is situated on the Singapore Straits, south of the mainland planning area of Bukit Merah. It also shares maritime boundary with the Western Islands planning area. The planning area has two subzones: Sentosa and the Southern Group, the latter of which includes all the major islands except Sentosa.

== History ==
In 1996, the Singapore government planned to develop the southern islands with waterfront housing on Sentosa, Pulau Seringat and Lazarus Island. The rest of the islands were to be developed with recreational facilities and hotels. New jetties were to be built with a Light Rapid Transit system connecting Sentosa Cove to the mainland and water taxis for the rest of the islands. Pulau Seringat and Lazarus Island were also planned to be merged as a single island.

As part of the Singapore Tourism Board's (STB) plan to develop the other Southern Islands after Sentosa, land reclamation was started in 2000 to link Pulau Seringat and Lazarus Island. The reclamation created a sand bank between the two islands, forming a lagoon that has an unobstructed seaview.

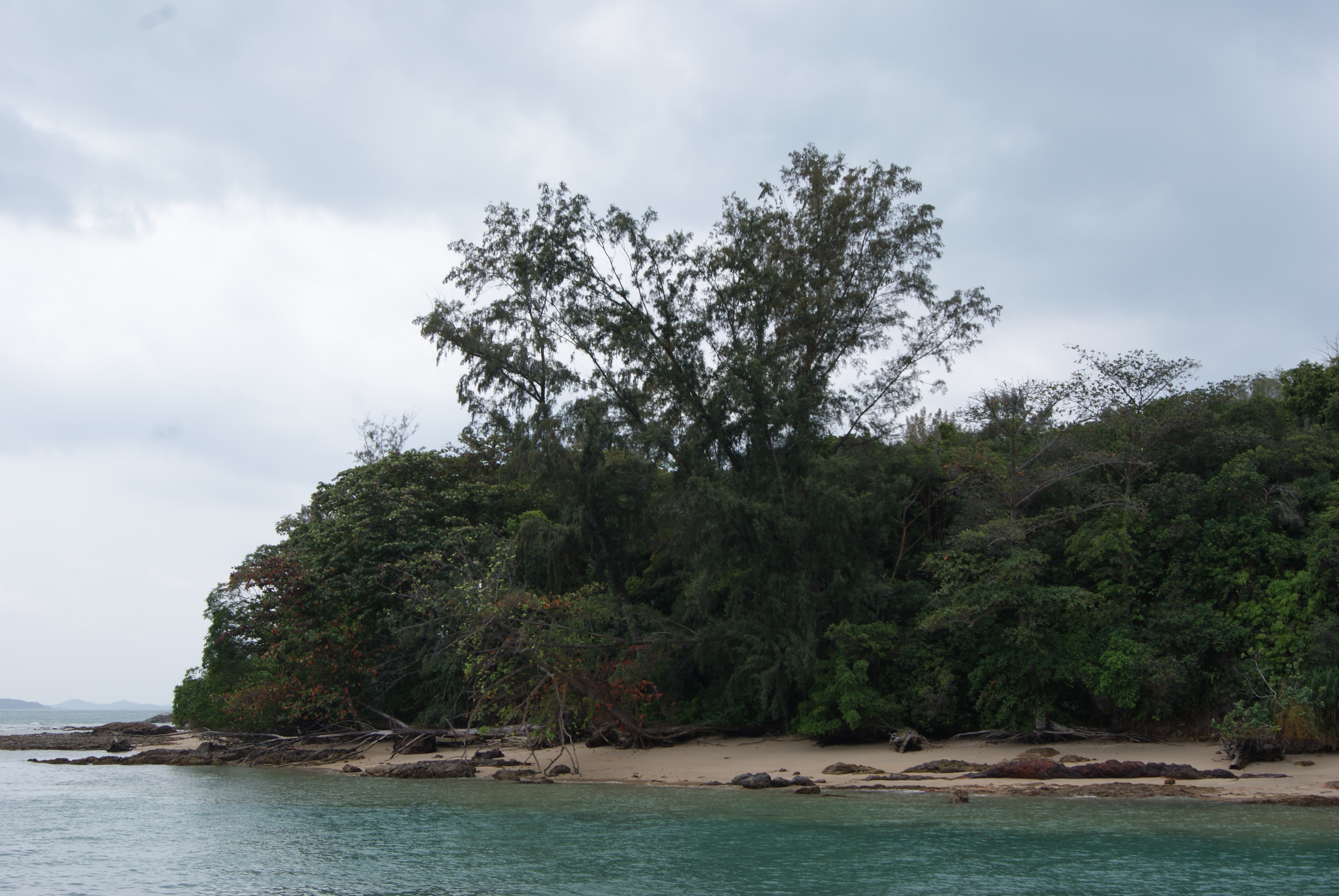
Pulau Seringat, photographed in February 2011

Pulau Seringat, which is now part of the extended Lazarus Island, now has an 800-metre stretch of beach. Thousands of cubic metres of sand, checked for sandfly eggs, was imported from Indonesia to make the beach. 1,000 mature coconut trees were also planted to add to the island feel of the place.

A causeway connecting Lazarus Island and Saint John's Island was also built to make the three islands more accessible and help attract more visitors.

Previously a shoal that was barely visible at high tide, Kias is now an island that houses an electricity generator with enough capacity to support the other three islands.

The reclamation took six years to complete and cost S$60 million. Another S$120 million was spent to bring water, electricity, gas and telecommunication infrastructure from Sentosa to the islands. The submarine services link consists of a 1.2-kilometre trench holding utility lines that lie 17 metres underwater. It links Sentosa Cove to Kias Island, and is protected underneath 50,000 tonnes of rock. It holds two 12-inch (30 cm) gas pipelines, two 12-inch (30 cm) water pipelines, four 22 kV power cables and four 96 core fibre optic cables for telecommunications.

The entire project cost nearly S$300 million and took about 15 years of planning.

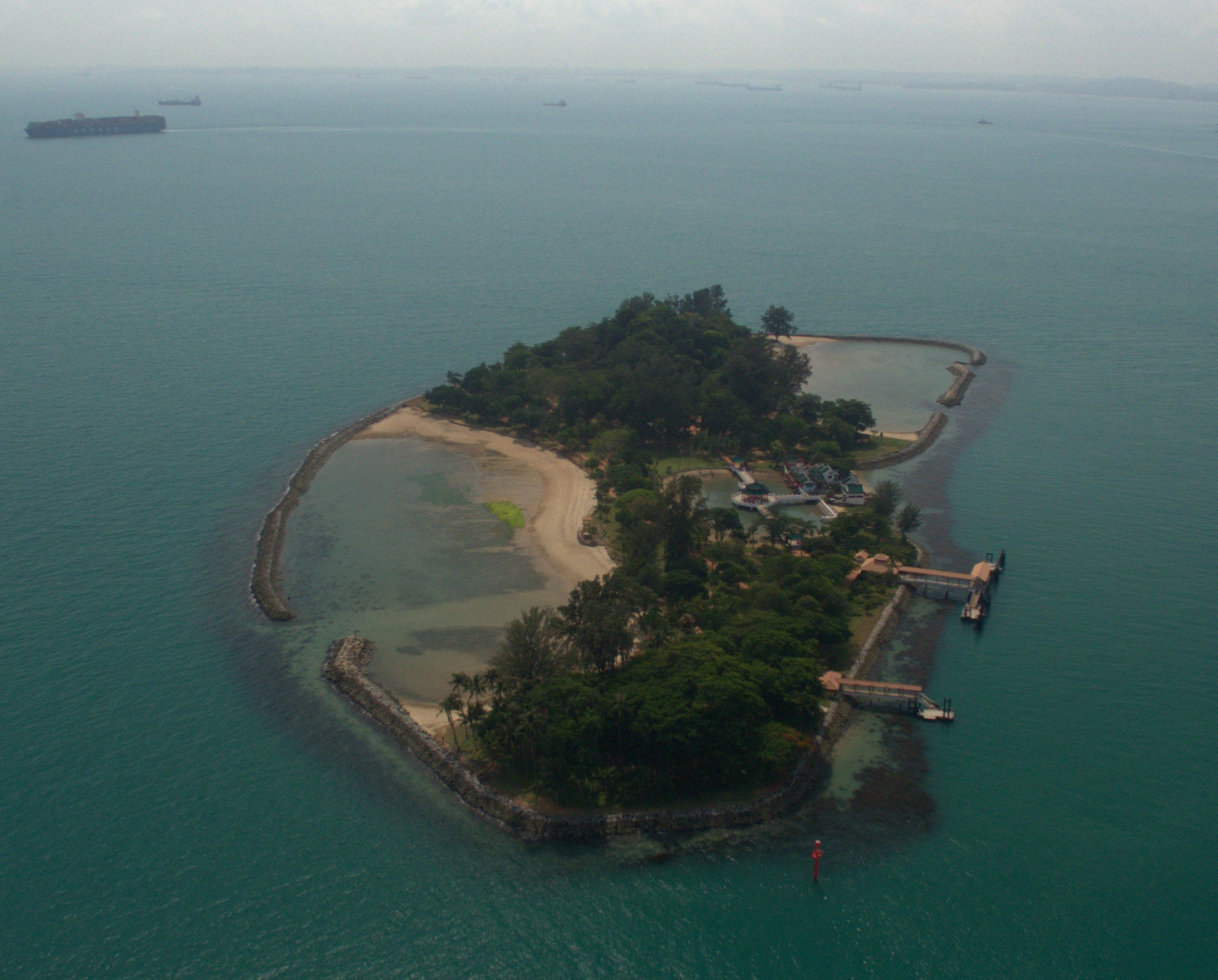
Aerial perspective of Kusu Island, Singapore. Shot in 2016.

In November 2006, the STB announced plans to develop the six islands off the southern tip of Sentosa into a tourist attraction. These islands include the Sisters' Island, Kusu Island, Lazarus Island and Saint John's Island, which draw at least 100,000 visitors a year. These are mainly pilgrims, campers, day-trippers and canoeists.

This, STB's S$12 billion Sentosa master plan — which includes HarbourFront and the Southern Islands — was expected to be completed ahead of schedule in 2010. The STB intends to tap on the momentum of the Sentosa Integrated resort bid and extend investor interest to the islands nearby.

Over the years, there have been several suggestions on how to develop the islands, from turning them into a centre for water sports, to developing eco-tourism and promoting fishing. Even a retirement village was promoted. However, these plans did not materialise.

The STB reckoned that the time was ripe to attract investors to develop the islands, which lies about a 20-minute ferry ride from the Singapore Cruise Centre and 30 minutes from Marina South Pier.

Exploring the potential of developing land around the Marina Bay and Sentosa areas, the STB has concluded that enhancing the lush greenery and natural foliage of the Southern Islands will make them irresistible as a tourist destination. The Southern Islands currently has a Chinese temple, natural ecosystems and a resort-like atmosphere. Therefore, it was conceivable to turn some of them into a resort island, a cultural site or an interactive rainforest park.

There is also some potential for the Southern Islands to become a themed destination, mixing education and entertainment, that leverages on its natural resources. It has been said that the potential is similar to Italy's Isle of Capri, a marine village, or Dubai's The Palm islands, a development for the ultra-wealthy. However, it may be difficult to develop the islands as a mass tourist destination because they lack a land link to the main island. Instead, a plan is being considered to turn them into a getaway for the well-heeled who can afford the luxury and those who want to explore the rustic surroundings for the islands' flora and fauna, including 300 species of native wildlife.

With the completion of land reclamation works to link Pulau Seringat, Lazarus Island and Saint John's Island, the STB set its sights to develop the cluster by 2015, the year they planned to hit its target of 17 million annual visitors and S$30 billion in tourism receipts. The STB expected to announce details for the development of the Southern Islands and seek requests for concepts as early as March 2007.

However, in April 2007, STB announced that the plans for the Southern Islands have been put on hold. Industry sources said that the Government is considering housing a casino on the six-island cluster. STB met potential investors in January 2006 to gauge their interests and listen to ideas, but the results were apparently not very encouraging. To date, no decision has been made yet on the development concept, including whether a request for concepts exercise will be launched. It is the second time in three years that the authorities are rethinking plans for the Southern Islands.

== Facilities ==
Transport

Sentosa can be accessed via various methods by private and public transportation.

Two public ferry operators, Marina South Ferries and Singapore Island Cruise and Ferry Services, provides ferries to the other islands.

== Politics ==
Southern Islands exist once as its own eponymous Constituency which was first formed in 1955; after Singapore gained independence in 1965 and the electorate declined, the constituency was merged into Telok Blangah and has remained as its division since after the constituency was absorbed into Tanjong Pagar GRC in 1991 followed by West Coast GRC in 1997. In 2025, the Telok Blangah division returned from West Coast GRC to Tanjong Pagar GRC, with the Southern Island now absorbed into the nearby Radin Mas SMC instead.

== See also ==
- Western Islands
