= Sisters' Islands =

Islands in Singapore

Name transcription(s)
  - Chinese: 姐妹岛
  - Pinyin: Jiěmèidǎo
  - Malay: Pulau Subar Laut, Pulau Subar Darat
  - Tamil: சகோதரிகள் தீவு
  - Tamil Romanisation: Cakōtarikaḷ Tīvu
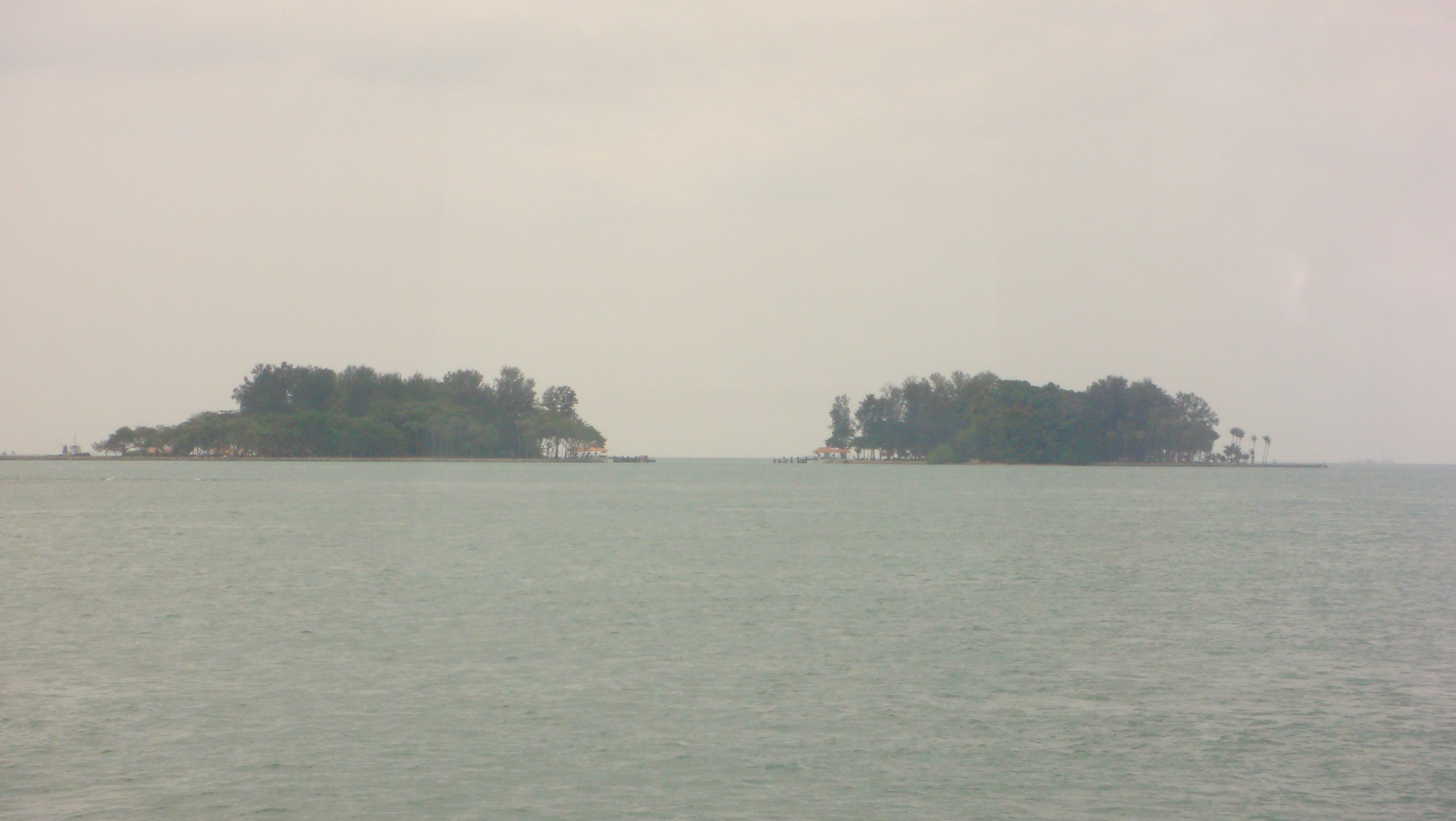
- As seen from Saint John's Island

- Location of Sisters' Islands within Singapore
- Coordinates: 1°12′54″N 103°50′00″E
- Country: Singapore

Area
  - Total: 0.056 km^{2} (0.022 sq mi)

Sisters' Islands are two of the Southern Islands in Singapore and are located to the south of the main island of Singapore, off the Straits of Singapore. They can be reached via a boat ride from Marina South Pier or West Coast Pier.

Big Sister's Island, about 39,000 m^{2} (9.6 acres) in area and also known as Pulau Subar Laut in Malay, faces the open sea, while Little Sister's Island, about 17,000 m^{2} (4.2 acres) in area and also known as Pulau Subar Darat in Malay, faces the mainland. The two islands are separated by a narrow channel. Currents through this channel can be very dangerous to swimmers and divers.

== Legends ==
There are three legends on how the Sisters' Islands come about.

The first version tells of two orphaned daughters, Minah and Linah, who stayed with their uncle on an island. One day, Linah met some pirates when fetching water from a well near the sea. The pirates chased her home and at her home, the pirate chief demanded to marry Linah the next day. On the next day, the pirates forcibly took Linah from her home and took her onto their boat. A storm broke out while Minah gave chase to rescue Linah and swam after the boat. While swimming after the boat, Minah drowned. Linah broke free from the pirates and jumped into the sea after Minah and subsequently drowned also. The storm stopped but the sisters could not be found. On the next day, two islands appeared where the two sisters were last seen.

Another version of the legend stated that the sisters were being blown away by the storm and each landed on one of the islands, and hence the name Sisters' Islands.

A third version of the legend said that there were two sisters who drowned at sea. The elder sister tried to save the younger sister but both drowned. God was touched by their love for one another and transformed both into two little islands so they could be together forever.

The two islands, called Pulau Subar Laut and Pulau Subar Darat, was then known as the Sisters' Islands. It was said that every year on that very day when the sisters turned into islands, there will always be storm and rain.

== Present ==
The beaches and warm blue waters make snorkeling a favourite activity at the islands. The islands are also popular with picnickers and campers and are also home to some of Singapore's richest reefs. A wide variety of corals can be found in the waters surrounding the islands. Common sea life that can be found includes hard corals, nudibranchs and octopus. Big Sister's Island is home to some long-tailed macaques.

Pulau Subar Laut, meaning Big Sister Island, is open to the public while Pulau Subar Darat, meaning Small Sister Island, is not open to the public due to a turtle hatchery located there.

=== Sisters’ Islands Marine Park ===
In July 2014, National Parks Board announced plans for a marine park on the islands. The park, known as the Sisters’ Islands Marine Park, is 160,000 m^{2} (40 acres) which encompasses the land and waters surrounding the islands, and also covers the western coasts of both St John’s Island and Pulau Tekukor.

The park, which is managed by National Parks Board, allows visitors to appreciate and understand Singapore’s marine habitats, through guided walks and the dive trails where divers can register with an approved dive operator. A Marine Park Public Gallery was set up at St. John’s Island to showcase the biodiversity in Singapore waters and is an alternative site for visitors to learn more about the marine life of Singapore.
