= Pulau Seringat =

Island off Singapore's south coast

Coordinates: 1°14′N 103°51′E

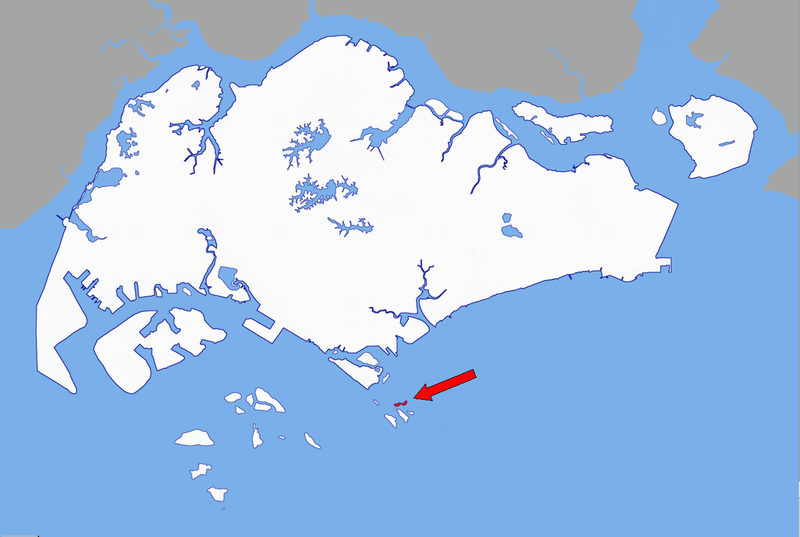
Location of Pulau Seringat

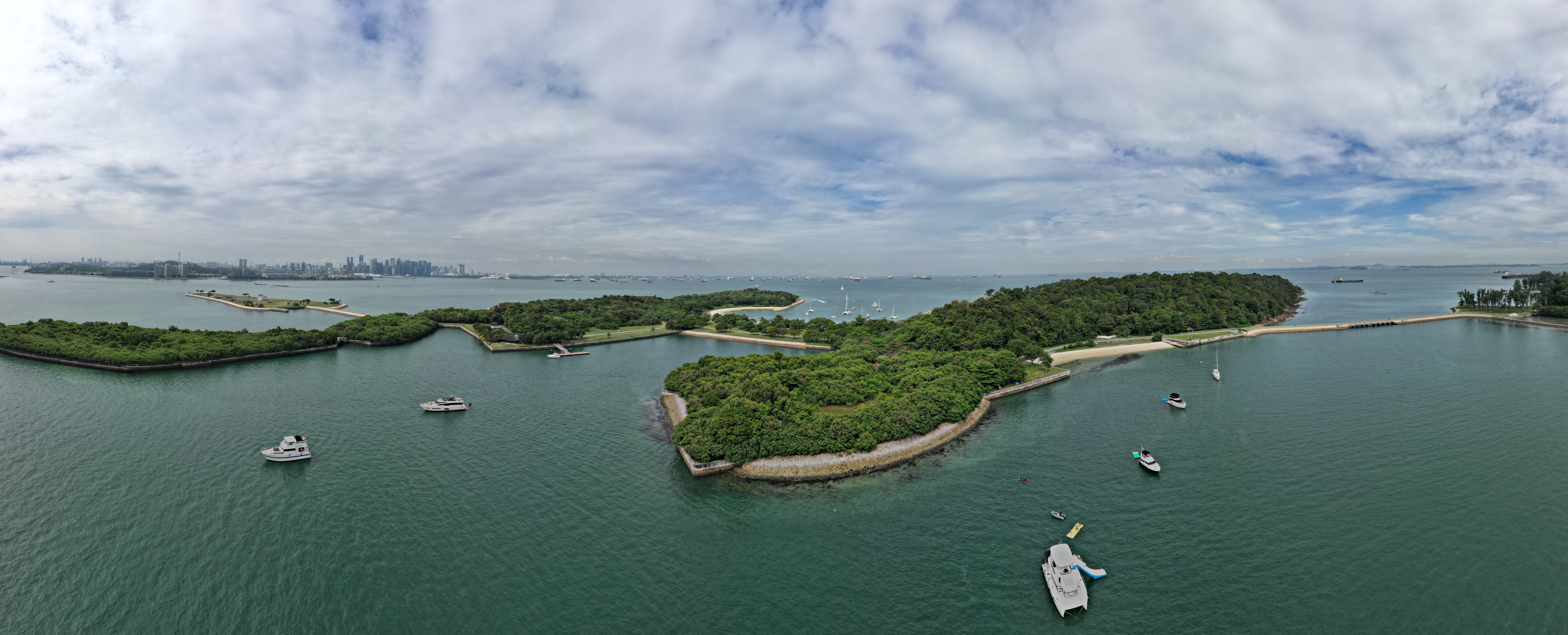
Pulau Seringat (left) and Lazarus Island (center)

Pulau Seringat is an island off the south coast of Singapore, and part of the Southern Islands region. In 2006, Pulau Seringat and Lazarus Island were linked by a sand bank. Before the 1970s there were about 15 households on the island. Nowadays the island is a tourist attraction, with the main way to access the island being taking a ferry to St. John's island and travelling over the bridge connecting the two islands.

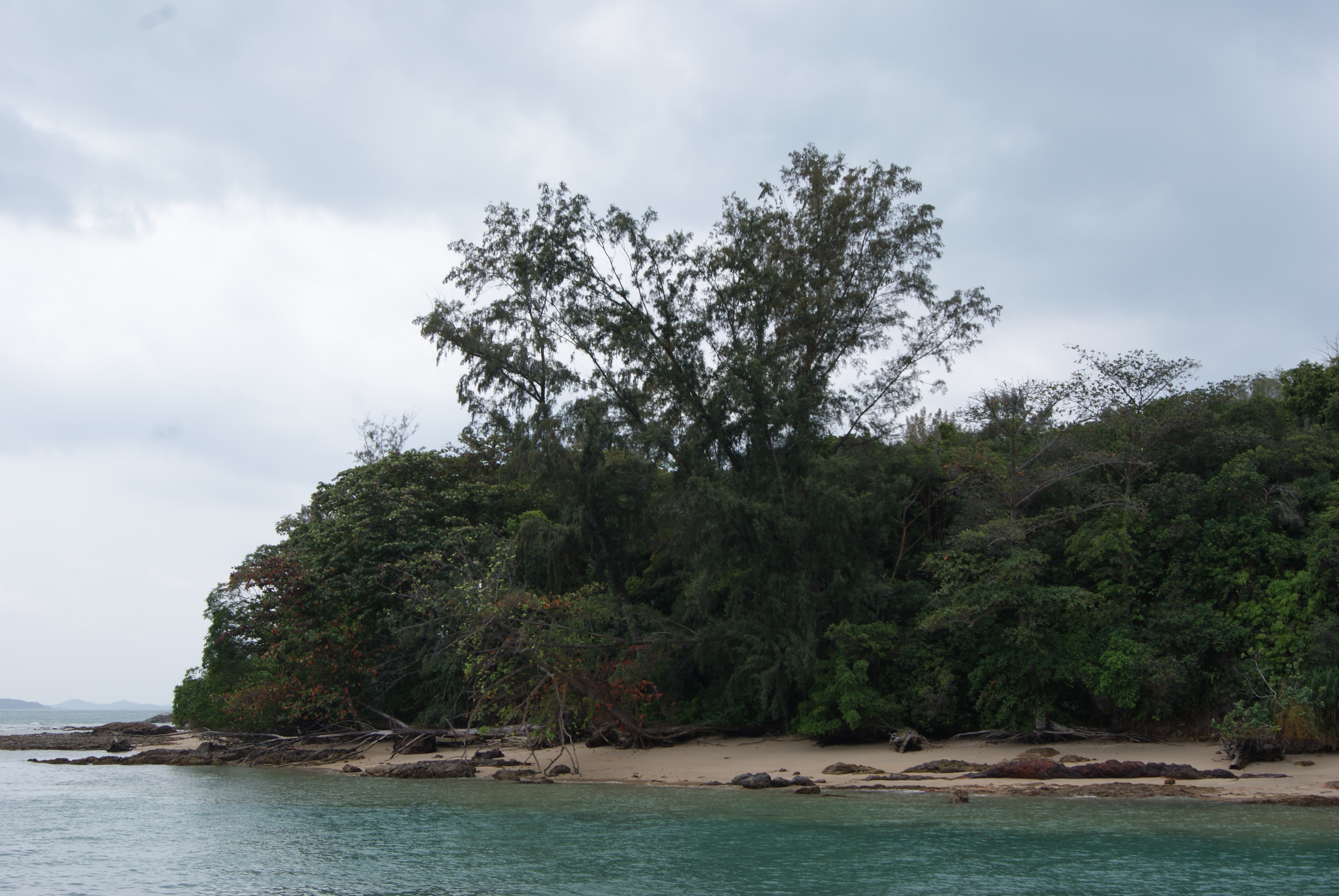
Pulau Seringat, photographed in February 2011
