= Lazarus Island =

Island in Singapore

Native name: Pulau Sekijang Pelepah
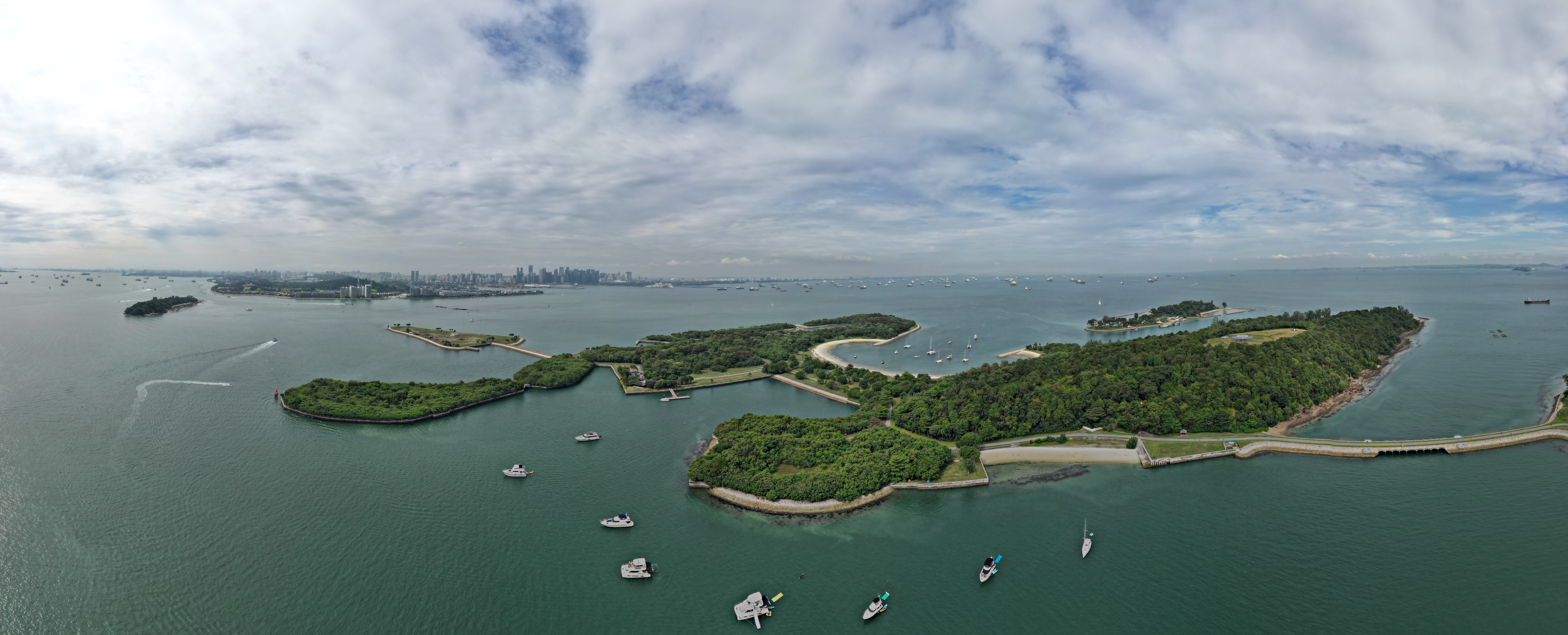
- Lazarus Island on the right

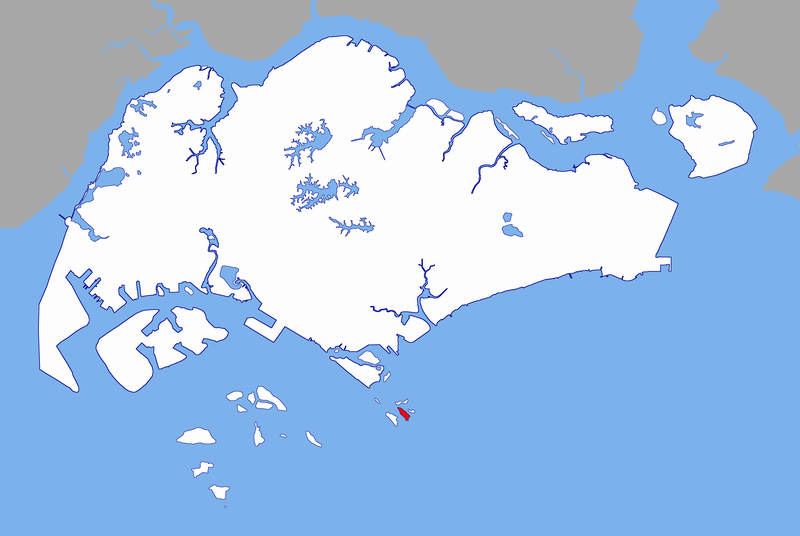
- Location of Lazarus Island

Geography
- Location: Singapore Strait
- Coordinates: 1°13′20.1354″N 103°51′19.296″E

Administration
- Singapore
- Region: Central Region
- Planning Area: Southern Islands
- Constituency: West Coast GRC
- Member of Parliament: Rachel Ong Sin Yen

Lazarus Island, formerly known as Pulau Sekijang Pelepah, is one of the Southern Islands in Singapore. It is south of the main island of Singapore, off the Straits of Singapore. It is connected by a causeway to Saint John's Island, which is reachable by ferry. It is not connected by land to the mainland.

== Etymology and history ==
Lazarus island was formerly known as Pulau Sekijang Pelepah (alternatively spelled as Pulau Sakijang Pelepah). Literally translated from Malay, 'sa', short for 'satu', means one, 'kijang' means deer, and 'pelepah' is a palm frond. Put together, it means 'Island of A Deer and Palms'. In 2006, Lazarus Island and Pulau Seringat were linked by a sand bank.

The island and nearby St Johns Island was originally a penal colony and a quarantine station initially for cholera, beri-beri then later for leprosy - a termed lazaretto - which may have been later changed to Lazarus. Lepers may also have been transferred to Lazarus Island (the connection being that the biblical character. (See Order of Saint Lazarus and Leper colony.)

== Gallery ==
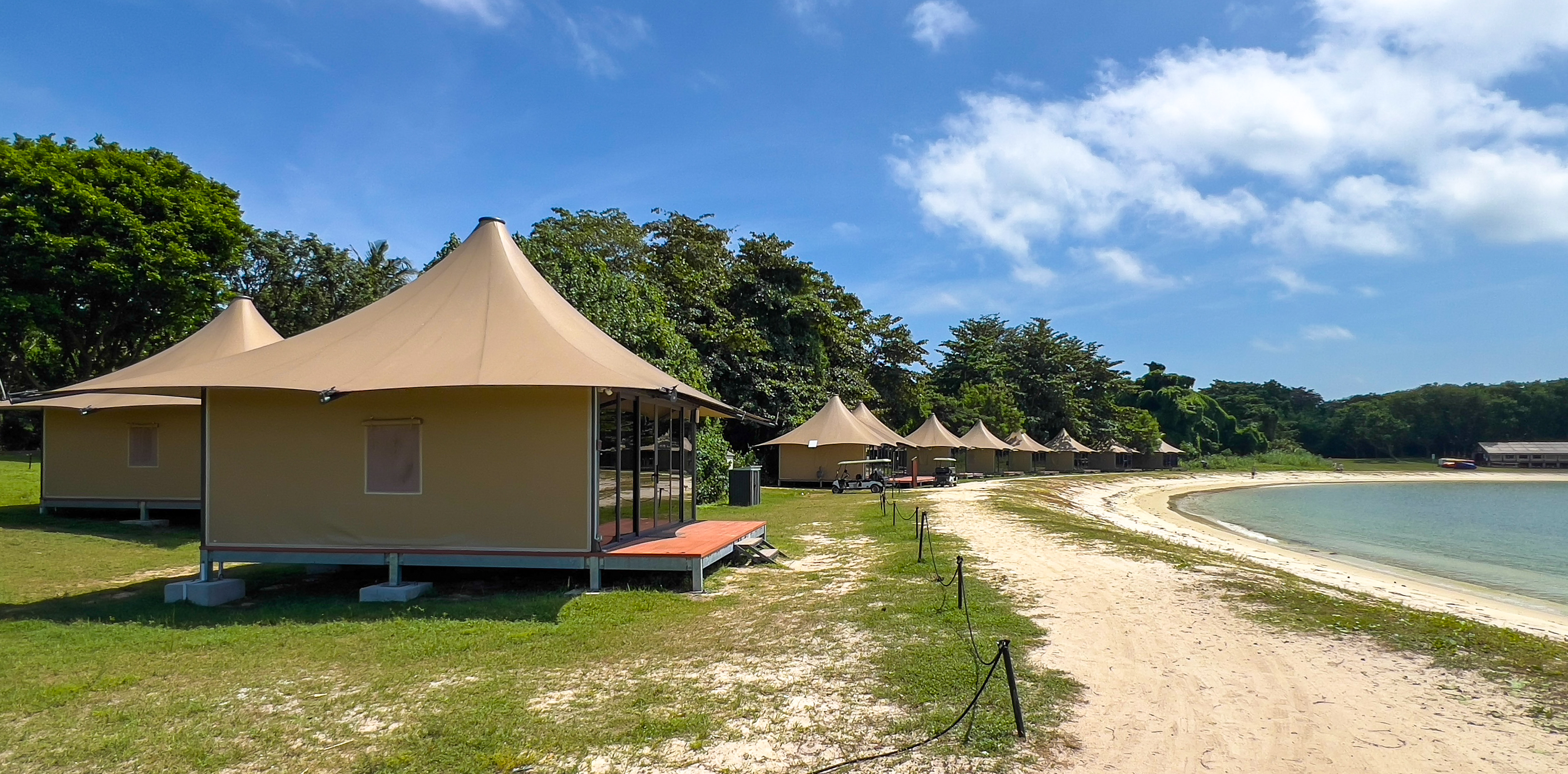
Into the Woods at Lazarus Island

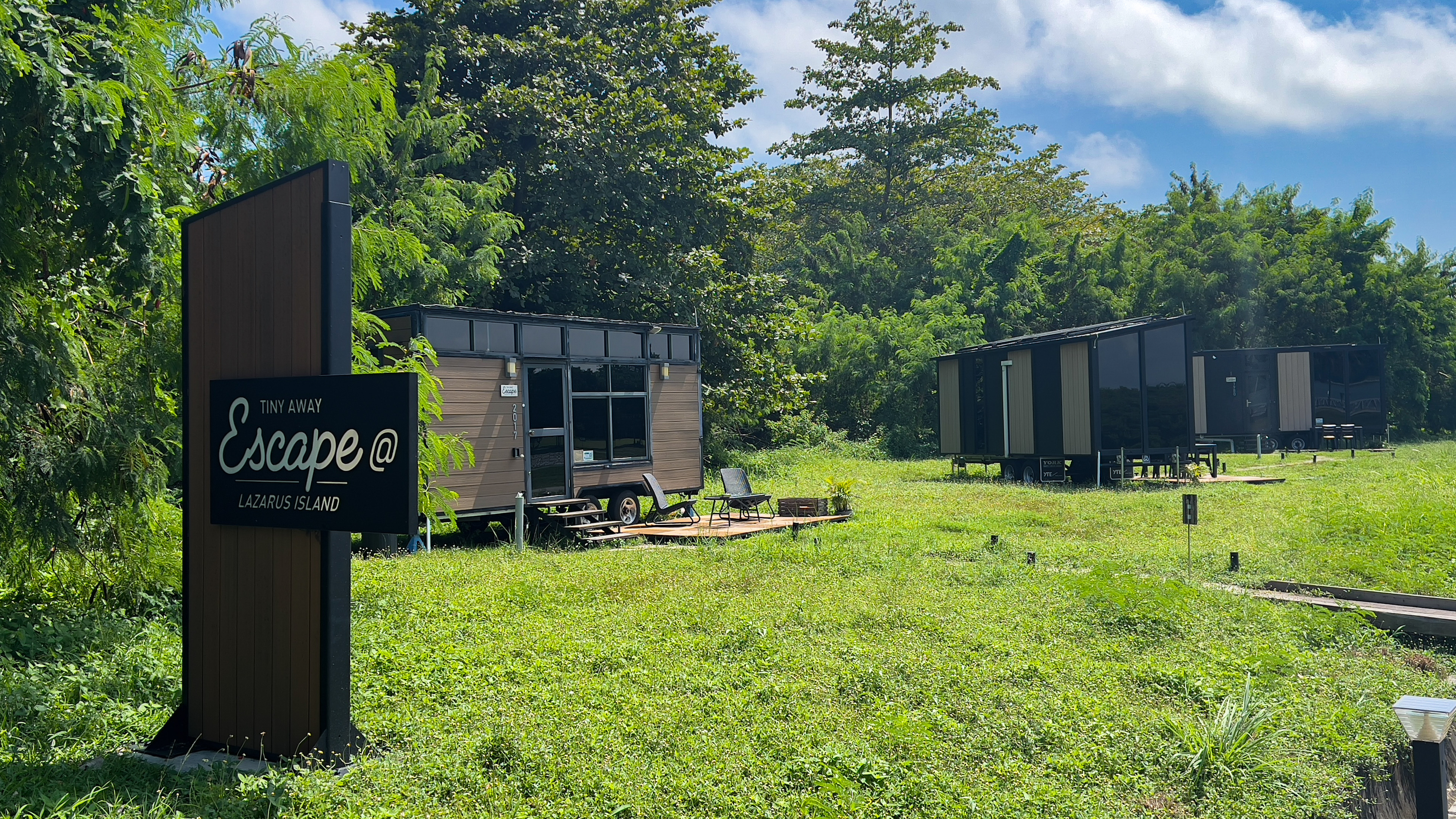
Tiny Away Escape at Lazarus Island

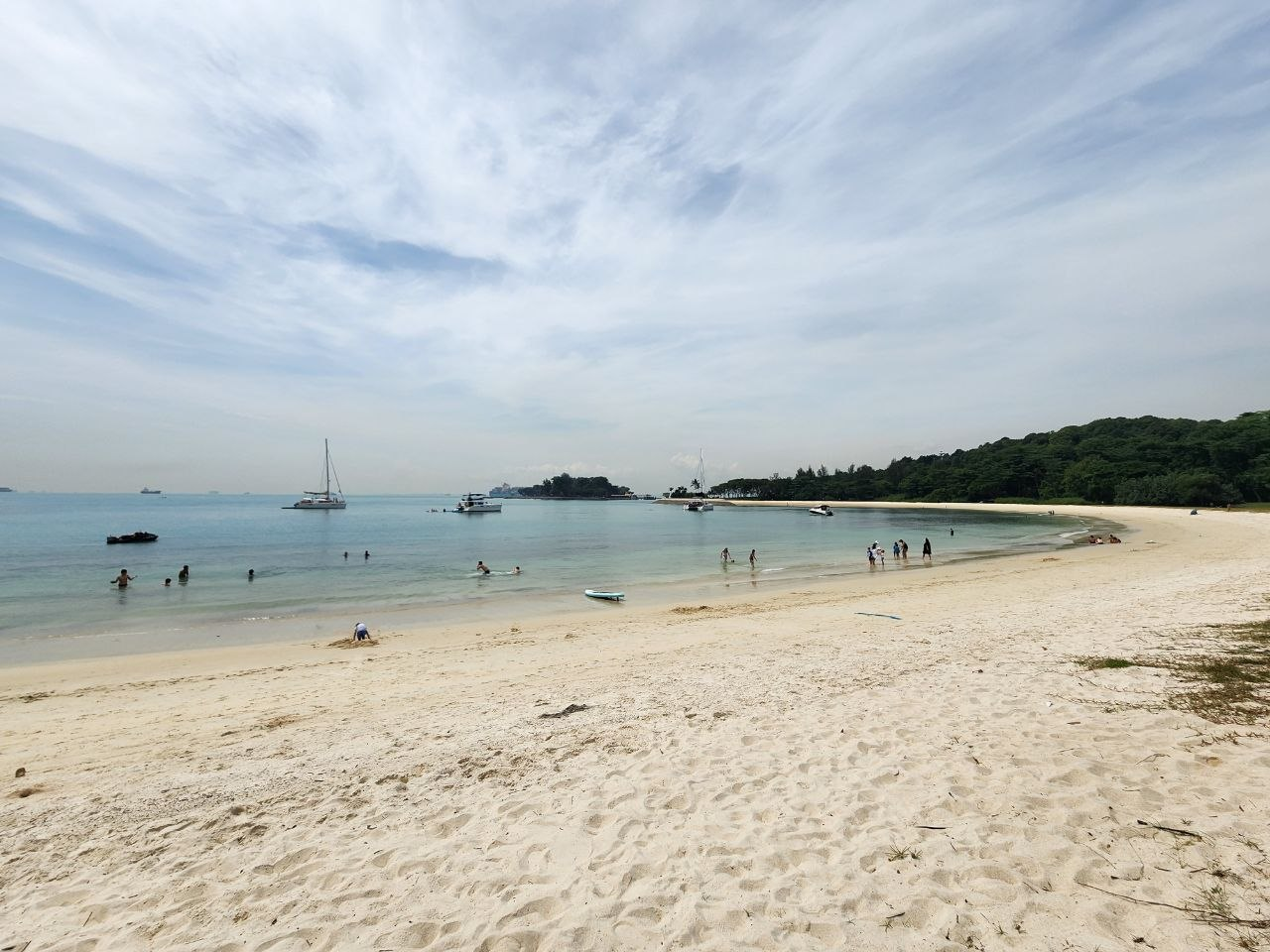
Lazarus Island Beach in 2023

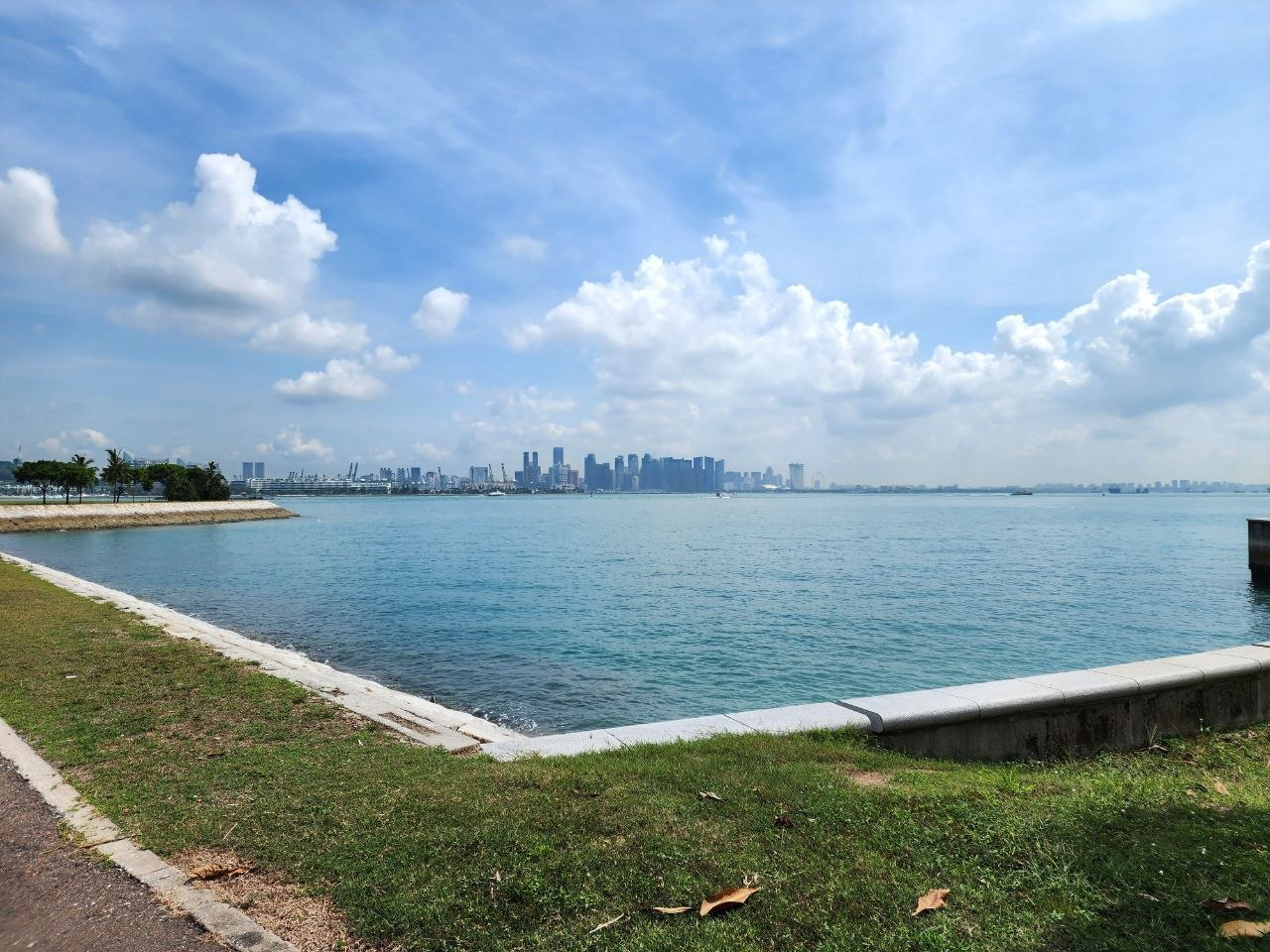
View of Central Area, Singapore from Lazarus Island in 2023
