= Changi Boardwalk =

Coastal footpath in Singapore

Coordinates: 1.3917°N 103.9736°E

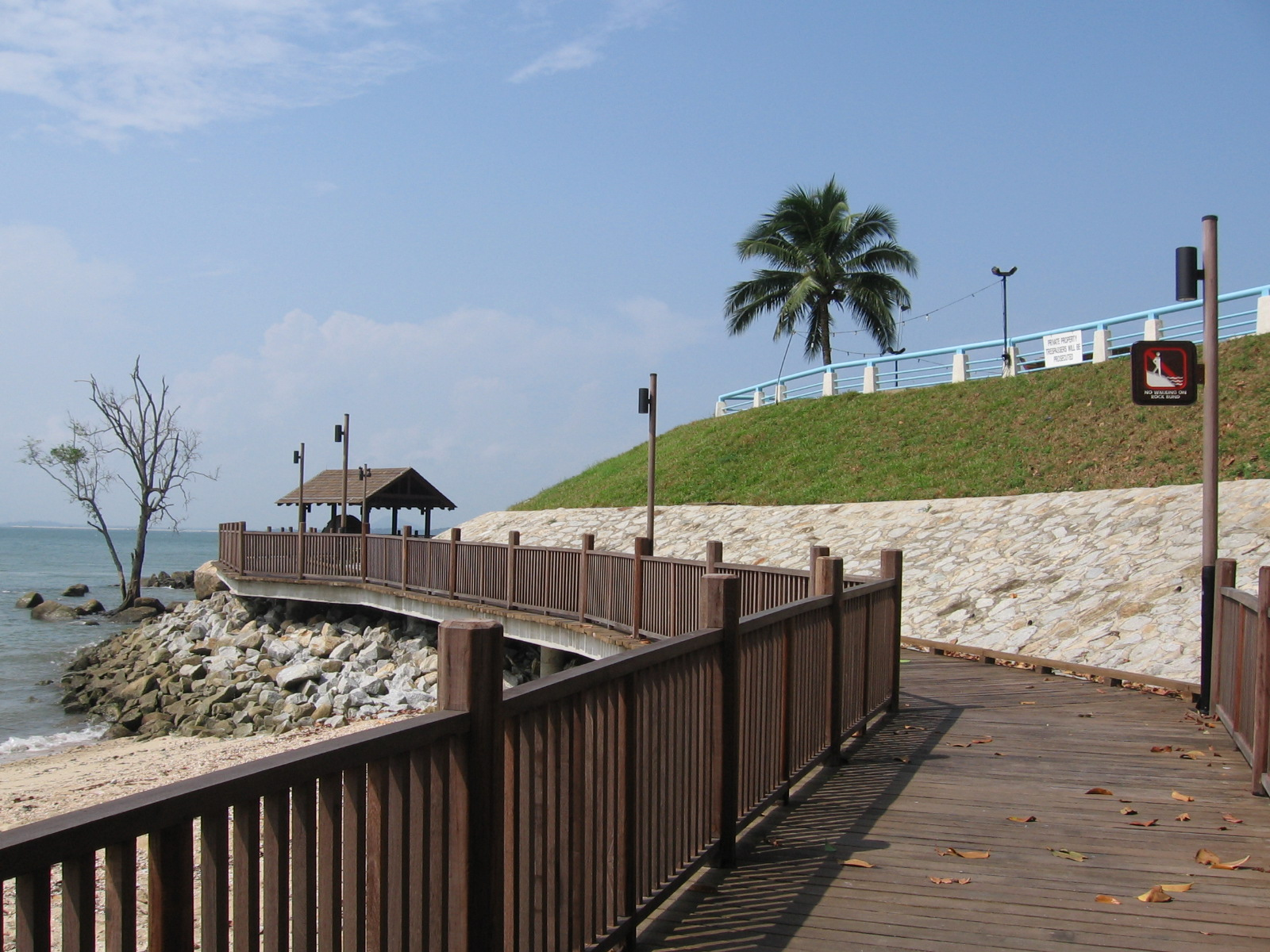
Changi Boardwalk

The Changi Boardwalk, (Note: (Chinese: 樟宜木板路)) also known as Changi Point Coastal Walk, (Note: (樟宜尾沿岸木板路)) is a 2.2 km boardwalk at Changi Point, Singapore.

== History ==
The Changi Boardwalk was conceptualised by the Urban Redevelopment Authority (URA) as part of the Singapore Green Plan 2012 to enhance Changi point. The first phase construction of the boardwalk, comprising the western sections of the boardwalk, started on 29 October 2001 and was completed on 15 August 2003, costing S$3.5 million. The second phase construction of the boardwalk, comprising the eastern sections, was completed in five stages from 2004 to 2006. The total cost of environmental improvement works for Changi Point – including the S$5.4 million boardwalks and S$8 million improvements to the Changi Point Ferry Terminal – was about S$16.7 million.

== Geography ==
The boardwalk is located at Changi Point, the easternmost part of Singapore. The boardwalk faces north-northwest to northeast for much of its length. It connects Changi Beach Club in the western end to the Changi Sailing Club at its midpoint and the Changi Point Ferry Terminal in the eastern end. The boardwalk is accessible from four entry points, namely Changi Village, Changi Sailing Club, Changi Beach and Changi Beach Park. The walk, with footpaths as wide as 2.4 metres, replaces mud tracks and trails that led from the road towards the rocky coastline. Night-lighting, tuned to a romantic glow, and rest points along the waterfront are among a host of amenities that the URA has put in place for visitors.

The area also offers a glimpse of giant heritage trees, such as the Damar Gajah Hitam, Tampines tree and the Malayan Rengas – all signposted – in the Netheravon Road area, which is connected to the coastal walk by a 1.5-km long park connector. The new park connector from Netheravon Road to Changi Village, completed in early 2005, links Changi Point to Pasir Ris and Changi Beach Park at a cost of $2.3 million. It includes a jogging and cycling track, fitness corners, rest areas and a surface car park for visitors.

== Sections ==
The Changi Boardwalk consists of six distinct sections: from west to east, Sunset Walk, Kelong Walk, Cliff Walk, Sailing Point Walk, Beach Walk and Creek Walk.

=== Sunset Walk ===
This is the westernmost portion of the boardwalk. It is flanked by a hill of lush greenery on one side and the sea on the other. Its western end has a beautiful view of the sunset, hence its name.

=== Kelong Walk ===
This stretch of the boardwalk is built above water on kelong-like stilts. Several lookout pavilions on this walk are popular fishing spots.

=== Cliff Walk ===
Built slightly inland, the Cliff Walk is a path through lush greenery. Viewing decks constructed along the Cliff Walk offer panoramic views of the surroundings.

=== Sailing Point Walk ===
The longest stretch of the boardwalk, the Sailing Point Walk is built beside the sea, in front of Changi Sailing Club.

=== Beach Walk ===
This is the second longest stretch of the boardwalk. The Beach Walk faces the Serangoon Harbour and Changi Beach.
