= Frog Island =

Frog Island may refer to:

- Frog Island, Leicester, England
- Frog Island, London, England
- Frog Island, Cobbosseecontee Lake, Maine, United States
- Frog Island, Niagara River
- Pulau Sekudu, Singapore
