= Changi Village =

Coordinates: 1°23′N 103°59′E

- Neighbourhood

Other transcription(s)
  - Malay: Kampung Changi (Rumi) كامڤوڠ چڠي (Jawi)
  - Chinese: 樟宜村 (Traditional); Zhāngyícūn (Pinyin); Chiang-gî-chhun (Hokkien POJ)
  - Tamil: சாங்கி கிராமம் Cāṅki kirāmam (Transliteration)
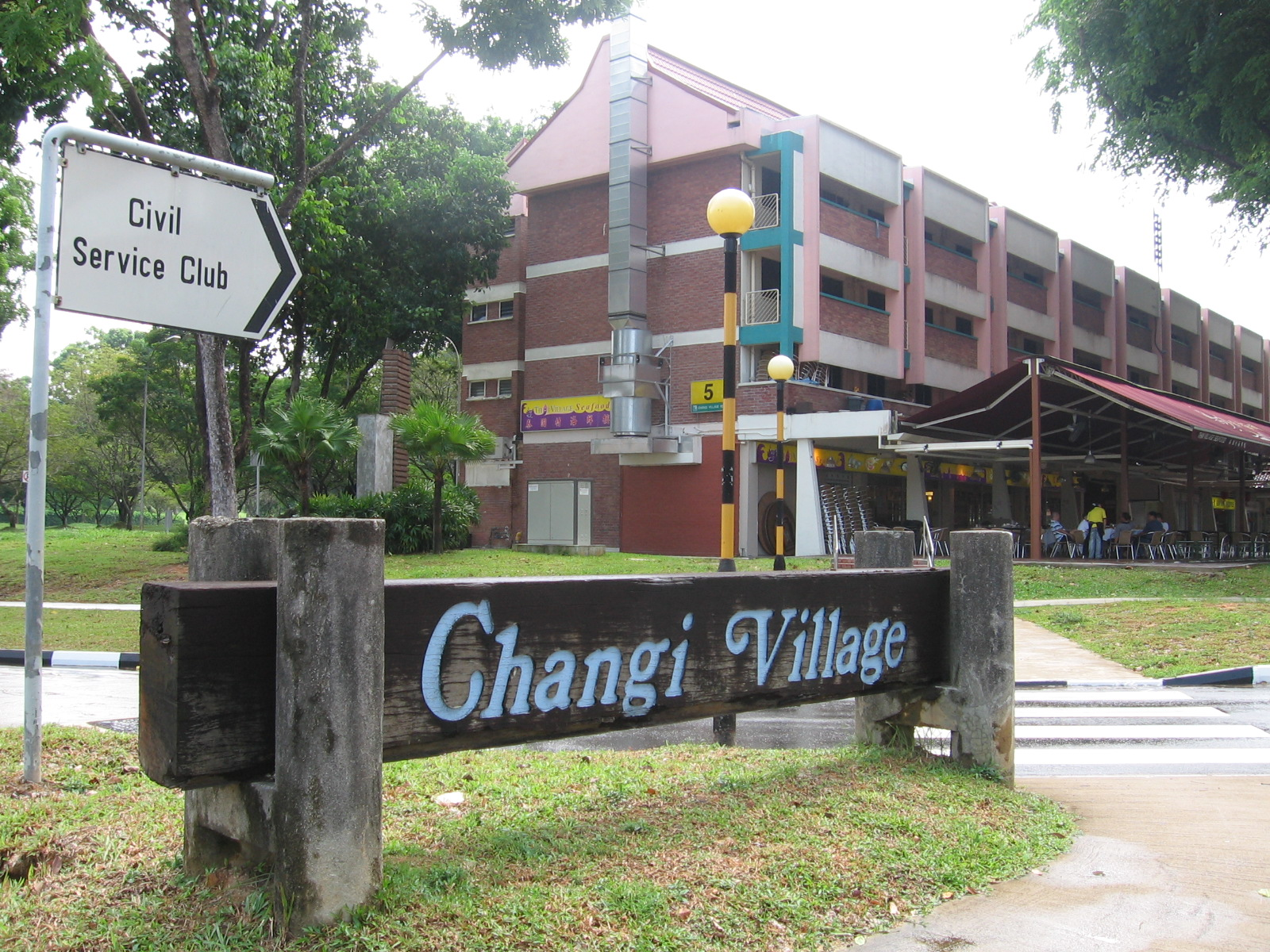
- Changi Village
- Interactive map of Changi Village
- Country: Singapore
- Region: East Region

Changi Village is a modern village situated at the northern tip of Changi, which is at the eastern end of Singapore. It is the usual connecting point for travellers heading to Pulau Ubin or Malaysia by ferry. Fishermen in the kelongs located at Serangoon Harbour offshore also use the jetty as a drop-off point to come onto the mainland. Changi Village also has many resorts and leisure facilities to cater for weekend getaways for many Singaporeans. It is also classified under District 17 for property indexing.

== History ==
=== Pre-independence ===
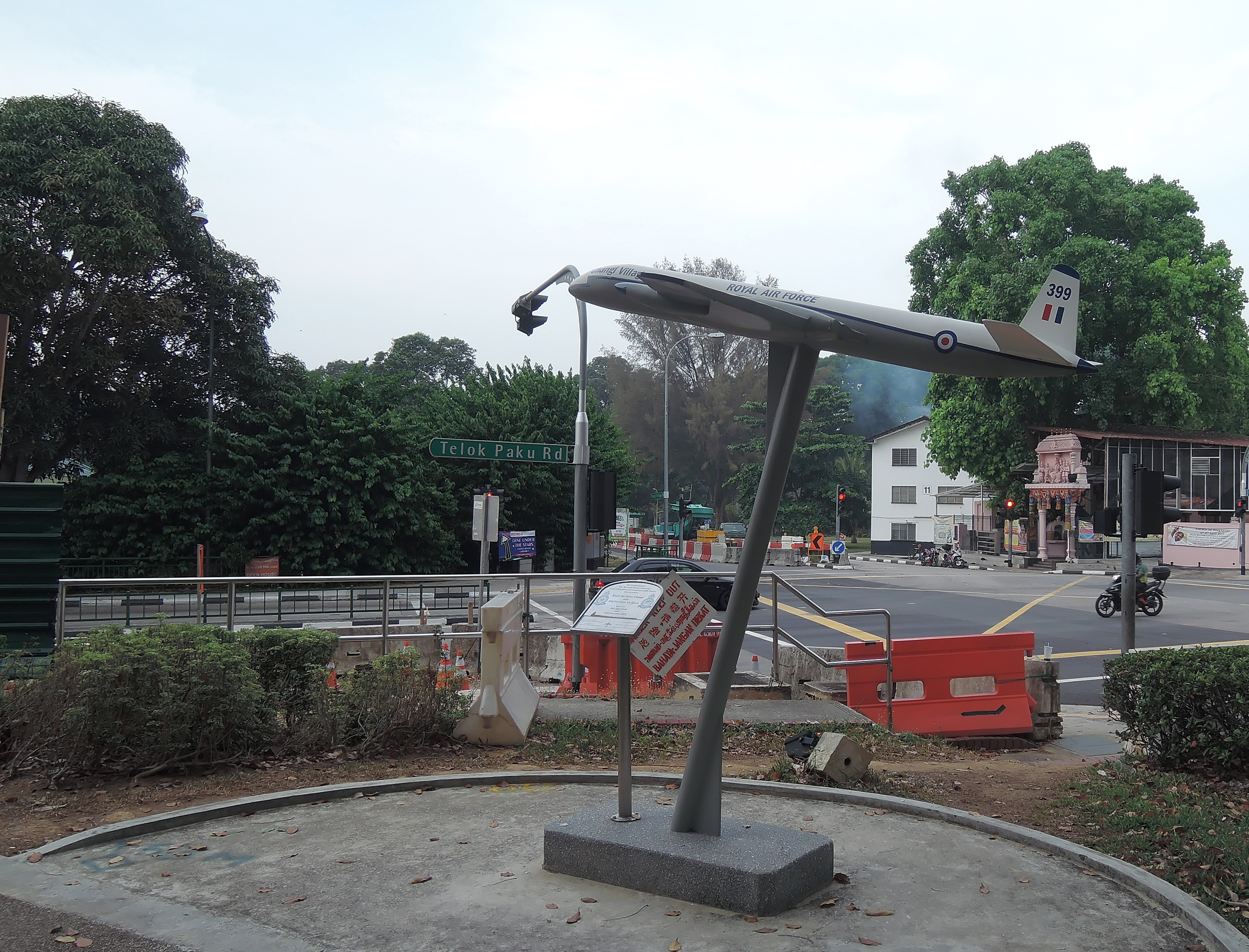
Royal Air Force Changi memorial (built 2010) to commemorate service of RAF air base and Far East Air Force Headquarters (1946–1971) in Changi Village

Changi Village has its early beginnings as a kampong village. The place was first redeveloped by the British as a summer house and a getaway location from the city centre of Singapore, in the 1890s, and was prized for its tranquillity and remoteness. The existence of the resorts there today still bear testament to the original redevelopments there. Starting from the 1920s, the British started building up Changi as tension across Asia and Europe started to build in anticipation for war. The infamous old Changi Hospital was also built there as a result.

During World War II, the place saw mass mobilisation of Allied troops in anticipation of the possible landing and invasion by the Imperial Japanese troops who landed on the nearby Pulau Ubin. However the manoeuvre by the Japanese was a bluff that drew vital Allied troops from the West of Singapore that eventually was the landing site of the Japanese troops. The area as part of the greater Changi defence also saw action of 3 giant artillery guns, also known as the Johore battery, used in the defence of Singapore. Their use and effectiveness in the defence of Singapore has often been controversial. The neighbouring Changi Beach Park was one of the site of the Sook Ching massacre during the Japanese occupation. After the war, the British rebuilt the area to become both a resort and an accommodation for ANZUK soldiers and their families as they continued to maintain military facilities in the nearby Changi Camp.

=== HDB town ===
After the British forces left the area in 1972, businesses in Changi Village had been poor. The following year, plans were announced to redevelop the village. Many shophouses were replaced with low-rise flats, the first batch of which were completed by the end of 1975.

In 1997, operations at the old Changi Hospital were moved to the new Changi General Hospital at Simei.

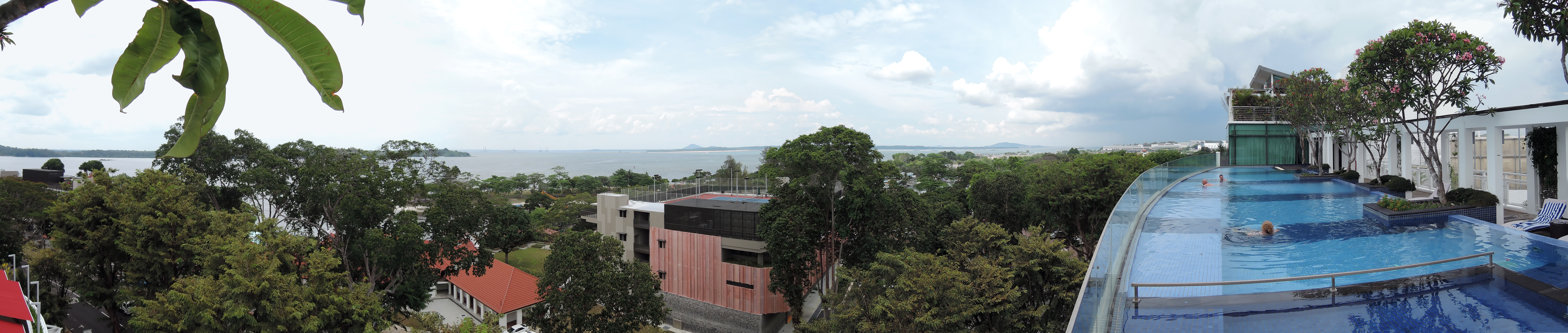
Changi Village panorama from the roof pool of the Changi Village hotel

In 2005, plans were announced to revive the "ghost town" that is Changi Village. As of 2014 the place is on track to being a hub for recreational activities as resorts and clubs in the area are undergoing refurbishment and tender for leisure and food and beverage operators are being rolled out. Despite the recent redevelopments, Changi Village continues to be relatively laid back compared to the rest of Singapore.

== Amenities ==
=== Education ===
Tthe BNP Paribas Campus, the first training institute in Asia-Pacific that seeks to train employees in the region, is located in Changi Village. The Singapore Aviation Academy has operated here since 1992.

=== Changi Village Hawker Centre ===
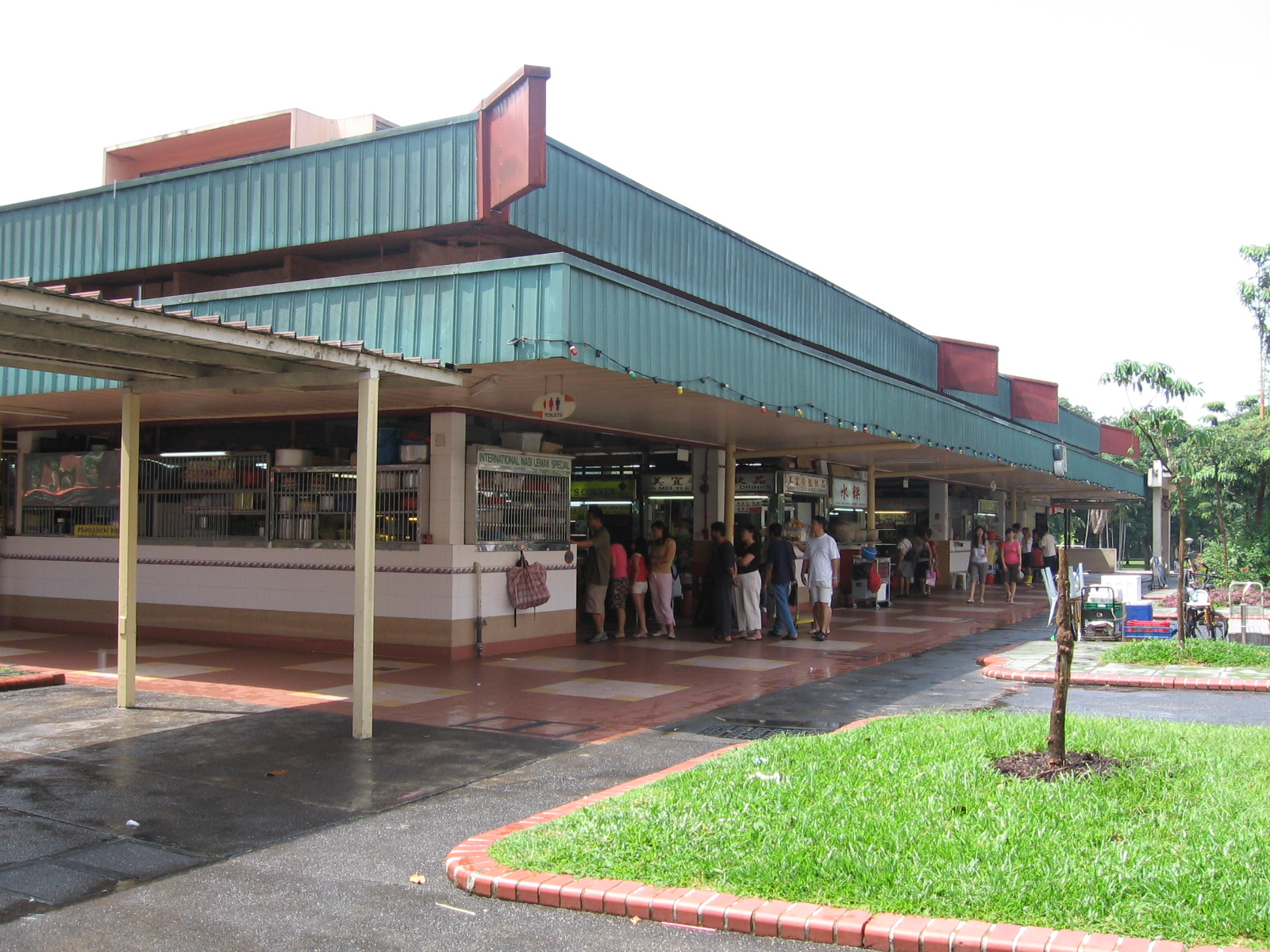
Changi Village Hawker Centre

Changi Village Hawker Centre is famous for its nasi lemak stall, where long queues are often seen. The hawker centre was closed between June 2013 and August 2014 for renovation.

=== Leisure ===
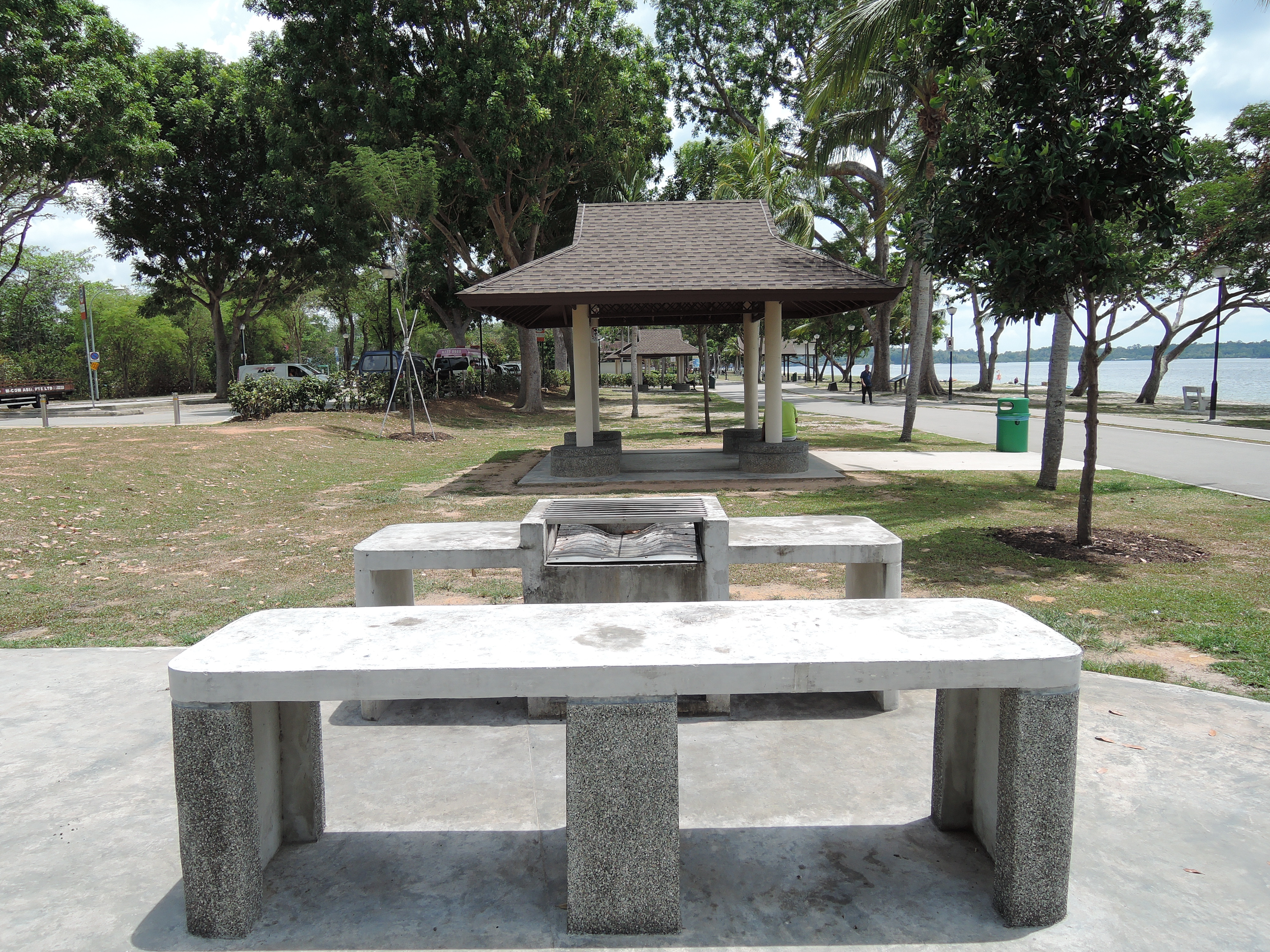
Barbecue pits in Changi Beach Park (Spring 2015)

Changi Beach Park, located at the shore of Changi Village, is connected via park connectors to East Coast Park and Pasir Ris Park.

=== Others ===
The area falls under the jurisdiction of the Bedok Police Division and the 2nd Singapore Civil Defence Force DIV HQ.

== Transportation ==
=== Changi Village Bus Terminal ===
Changi Village Bus Terminal was opened by 1975 to replace a smaller roadside bus terminal and serve the newly developed town. Bus services served by the terminal include service 2, which travels to Kampong Bahru Bus Terminal.

=== Changi Point Ferry Terminal ===
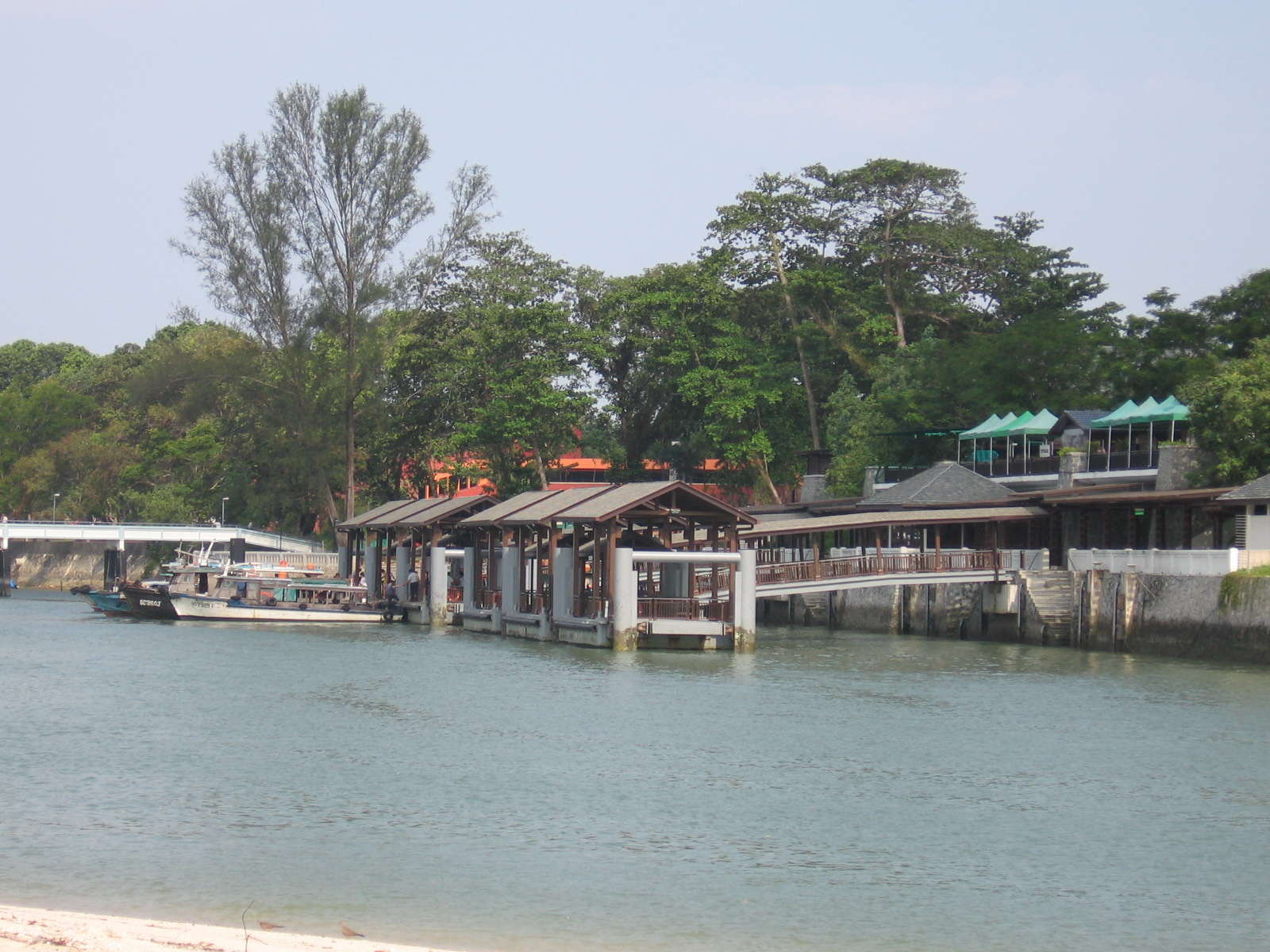
Changi Point Ferry Terminal

Changi Point Ferry Terminal, opened on 5 January 2005, serves small passenger ferries to the north-eastern islands, namely Pulau Ubin, and to Pengerang in Johor, Malaysia.
