= Pulau Sekudu =

North-Eastern Island of Singapore

Coordinates: 1°24′17″N 103°59′19″E

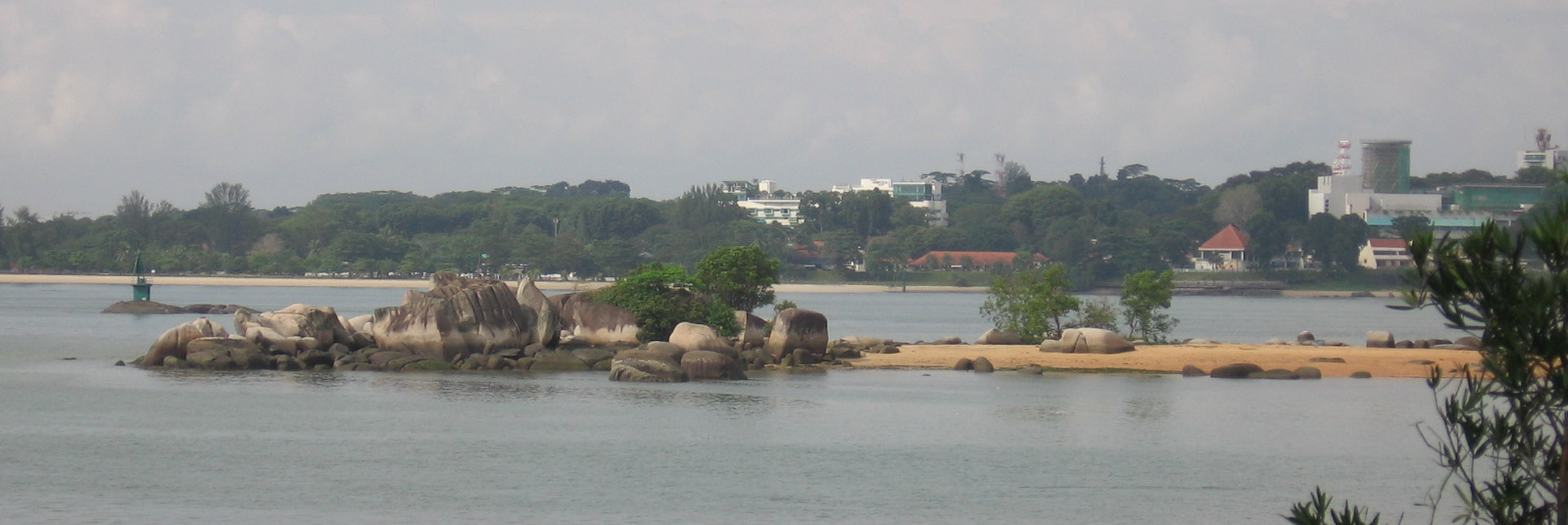
Pulau Sekudu

Pulau Sekudu (Chinese: 青蛙岛), or Frog Island, is an islet located just off Chek Jawa on Pulau Ubin, Singapore. It lies in the Serangoon Harbour opposite Changi. Despite its proximity, it is only reachable by boat, even at low tide. One can see the islet directly opposite the Chek Jawa Visitor Centre.

== Legend ==
Legend has it that three animals from Singapore - a pig, an elephant and a frog - had a challenge to see who could reach the shore of Johor first. Whichever animal failed to reach the shore would be turned into rock. All three creatures had difficulties swimming, and while the frog turned into Pulau Sekudu, both the pig and the elephant turned into a larger island, Pulau Ubin.
