= Changi Beach Park =

Park in Changi, Singapore

Coordinates: 1°23′00″N 104°00′06″E

- Changi Beach
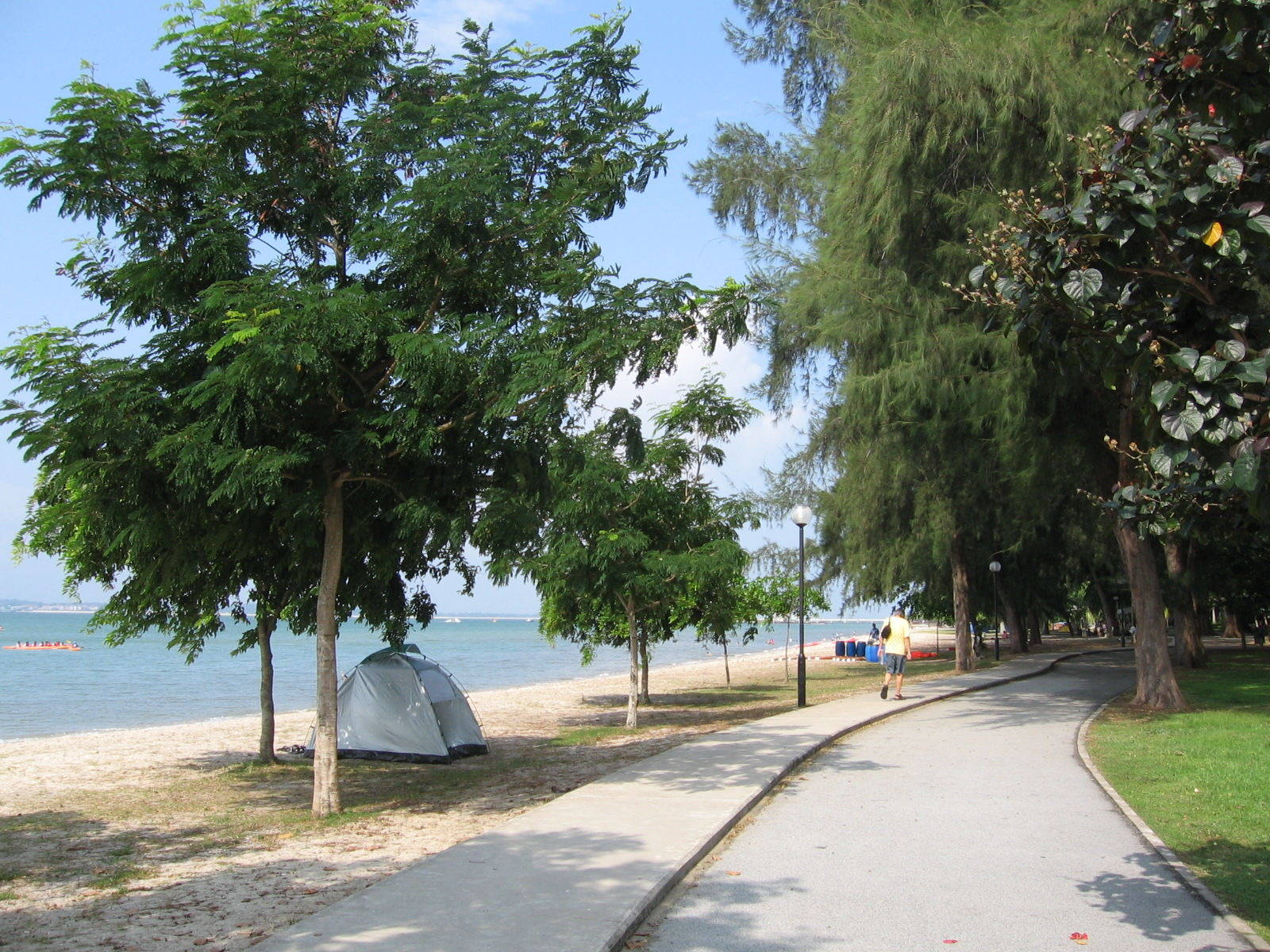
- Changi Beach Park

- Location within Singapore
- Interactive map of Changi Beach Park
- Type: Beach
- Location: Changi, Singapore
- Area: 28 hectares (69 acres)
- Manager: National Parks Board
- Status: Open

Changi Beach Park (Note: (Chinese: 樟宜海滨公园; Malay: Taman Pantai Changi; Tamil: சாங்கி கடலோர பூங்கா)) is a beach park located at the northern tip of Changi in the eastern region of Singapore.

The 28-hectare beach park is one of the oldest coastal parks in Singapore, retaining the "kampung" or village atmosphere of the 1960s and '70s.

== Description ==
The park is bounded by the sea on one side, opposite Pulau Ubin, and by Nicoll Drive and Changi Coast Road on the other. It stretches for about 3.3 km from Changi Point to Changi Ferry Terminal.

== History ==
=== The Japanese occupation ===
Changi Beach served as one of the killing grounds of Sook Ching massacre for the Japanese Imperial Army during the Japanese occupation of Singapore of the Second World War, where 66 Chinese male civilians were killed on the beach by the Japanese Hojo Kempei on 20 February 1942.

The war monument plaque was erected at the Changi Beach Park (near Camp Site 2) in the eastern part of Singapore. The inscription on the monument plaque reads:

66 male civilians were killed by Japanese Hojo Kempei (auxiliary military police) firing at the water's edge on this stretch of Changi Beach on 20 February 1942. They were among tens of thousands who lost their lives during the Japanese Sook Ching operation to purge suspected anti-Japanese civilians among Singapore's Chinese population between 18 February and 4 March 1942. Tanah Merah Besar Beach, a few hundred metres south (now part of Singapore Changi Airport runway) was one of the most heavily-used killing grounds where well over a thousand Chinese men and youths lost their lives.
— National Heritage Board.

=== Development ===
In March 1948, the Malaya Tribune reported that the beach at Changi Point was a popular place for people to spend their weekends, with attap houses available for rent and an enclosed area for swimming constructed using ship and aircraft remains. In 1950, the local government announced plans for the development of the beach, with the construction of a road connecting the beach to Tanah Merah Besar Road, as well as amenities for changing and the provision of refreshments. In addition, the attap houses on the beach were also to be cleared.

In May 1953, further plans to turn 20 acres (8.1 ha) of the beach into a resort were announced. The resort was to eventually have a capacity of several thousand patrons, and was to initially have changing facilities, a park and a bathing pagar. The road connecting Changi beach to Tanah Merah Besar Road was completed by the end of 1954, and work on the resort was completed in May 1958, at a cost of less than $1 million, lower than estimated. In October 1959, volunteers mobilised by the Singapore government cleared Changi beach of vegetation and rubbish. The government also announced plans to expand the resort with facilities such as carparks, hawker stalls, and a playground for adolescents.

=== The 1970s and 1980s ===
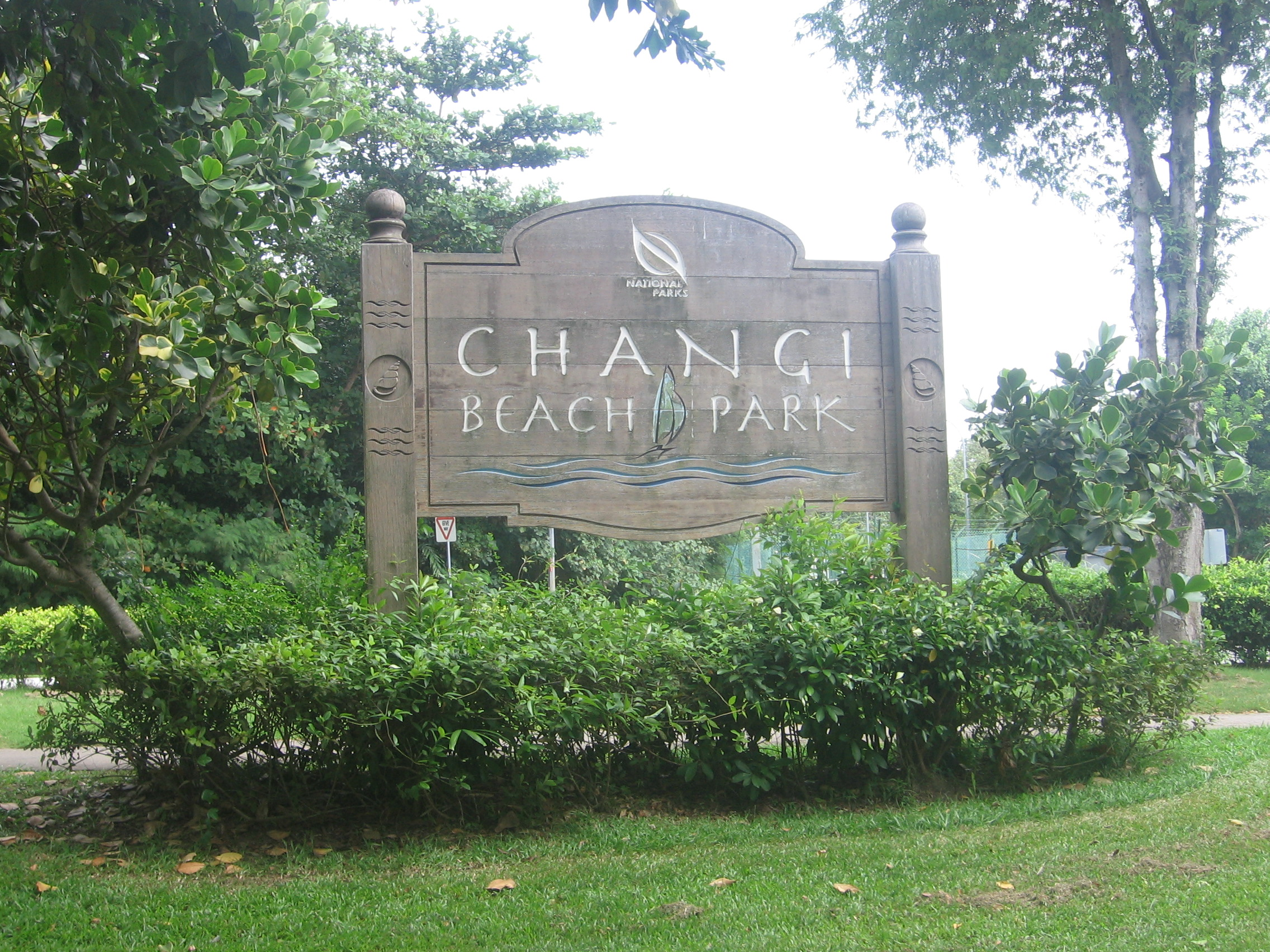
Changi Beach Park

In April 1970, plans to rent out four sites on the beach to private developers were announced by the government. By August 1971, four blocks of buildings containing dining establishments were built, and work on an 8 acres (3.2 ha) beach resort with fountains, sanitation facilities and restrooms was being carried out. A $600,000, 5 acres (2.0 ha) development near Changi Point, consisting of a 1000-seat restaurant, a coffeeshop, food stalls and 16 chalets, was completed by January 1972, and Aloha Rhu, a $250,000, 1.25 acres (0.51 ha) development with a Polynesian theme, was opened by Chinese New Year that year. In 1975, two-thirds of the beach was acquired by the government for the construction of a second runway as part of the development of Changi Airport. With the closure of a large part of the beach, the beach lost its popularity among beachgoers.

In November 1984, as part of plans to rejuvenate Changi Point, a 4,000 square metres (43,000 sq ft) portion of the beach was turned into a special park for children with eight playgrounds, sand pits, and park furniture. Constructed at a cost of $73,000, the facilities within the park were completed in May 1985. Between August 1987 and March 1988, the amenities at the park were improved.

=== The 2000s ===
In April 2001, the park was given a $4 million upgrade, which included new shelters and other facilities, intended to give the park a rustic charm.

== Present ==
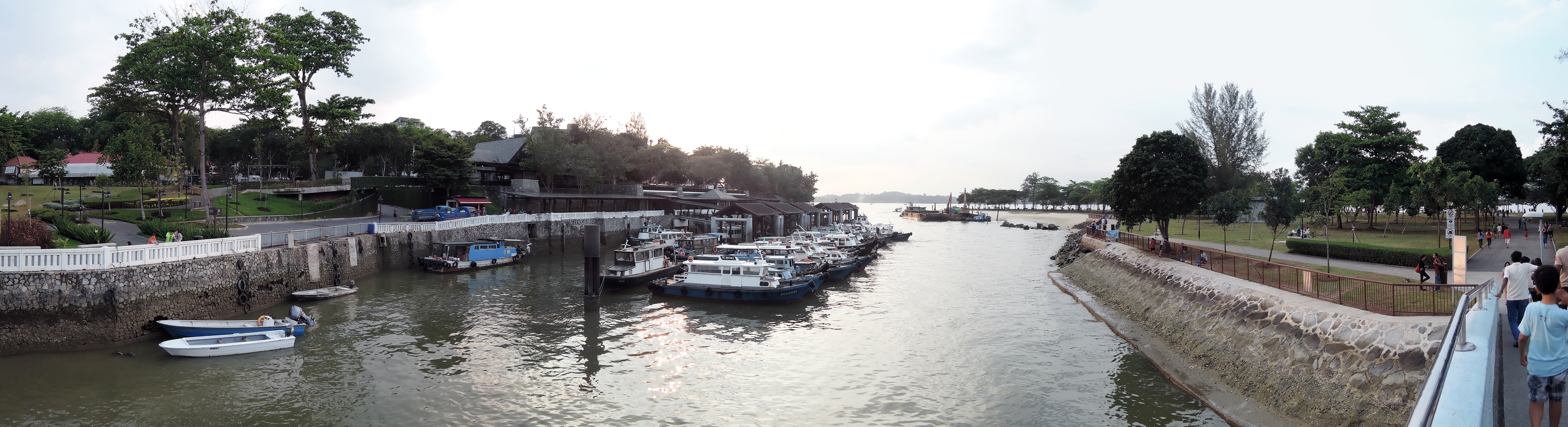
Changi Beach park (right) and Changi Point ferry terminal (left) in 2015

Changi Beach Park is popular among locals as a hangout for overnight family picnics, especially on weekends. Some individuals enjoy fishing, watching landing airplanes, jogging and watching the sunrise or sunset here. Sunrise can be viewed from the SAF Changi Ferry Terminal on the eastern end of the park and sunsets can be viewed from Changi Point. Barbecue parties, camping and watersports are some common activities. In addition, food lovers visit Changi Beach for seafood or for different food options at Changi Village.

The park has been designated with the code 9V-0009 by the international Parks On The Air award program, and so is regularly 'activated' by Amateur Radio operators using portable equipment.

== Seahorse Monitoring Project ==
Since May 2009, the National Biodiversity Centre, together with volunteers from National Parks Board and nature groups such as Wild Singapore and TeamSeaGrass, initiated a project to monitor identified populations of Seahorse (Hippocampus kuda) and Pipefish (Syngnathoides biaculeatus) in several locations including Changi Beach for conservation management purposes. The data gathered will help to estimate the population size, growth rate of individuals and track their movements in their natural habitats.

== See also ==
- Changi
- Changi Boardwalk
- Changi Village
- Sook Ching
- List of parks in Singapore
