= Singapore Aviation Academy =

Coordinates: 1°23′N 103°59′E

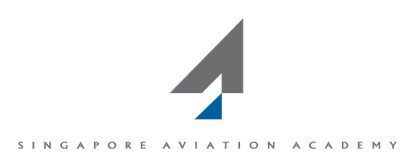

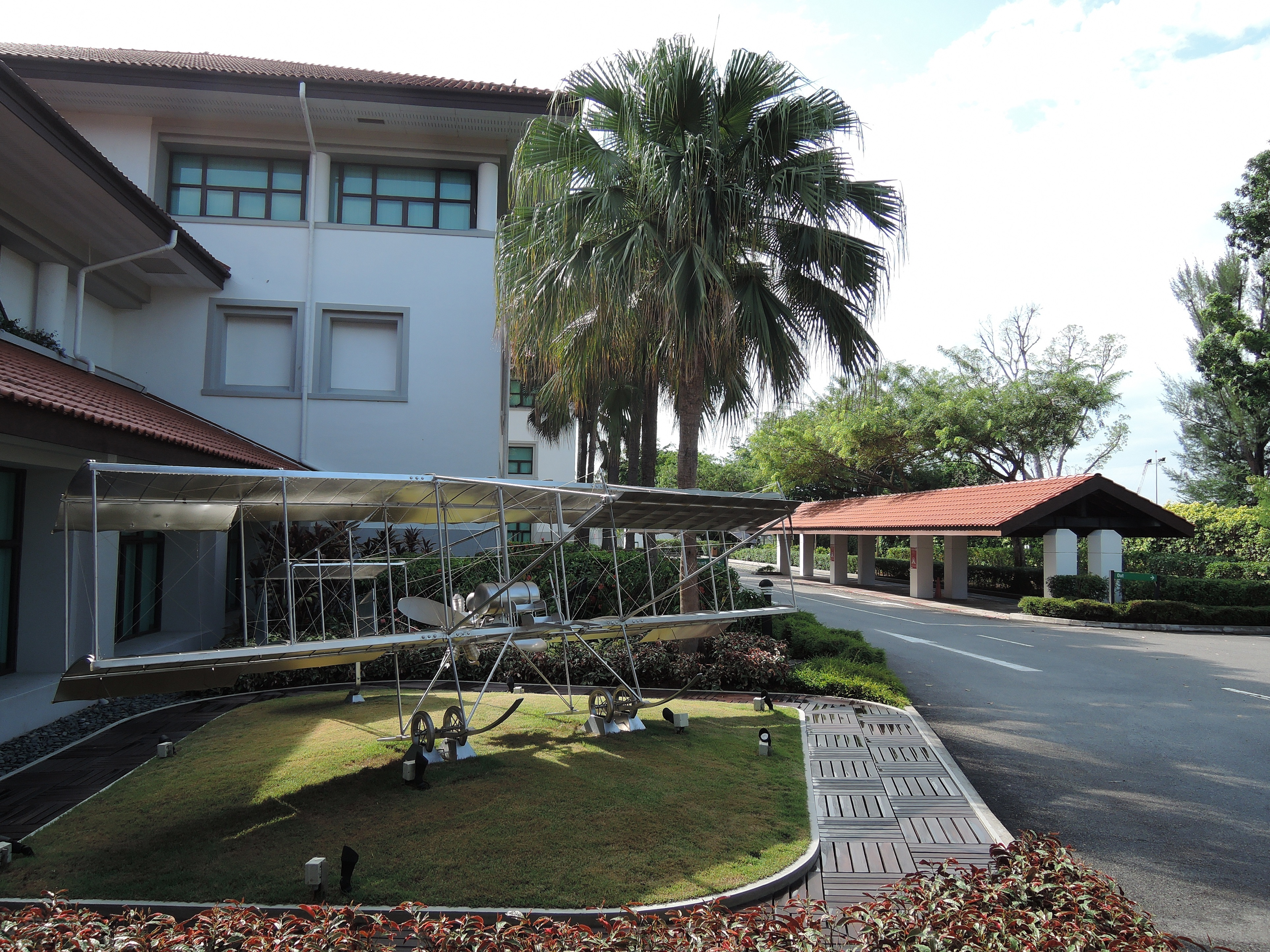
- Entrance yard of the Singapore Aviation Academy (2015)

Agency overview
- Formed: 1958; 68 years ago
- Jurisdiction: Government of Singapore
- Headquarters: 1 Aviation Drive; Changi Village; Singapore 499867
- Agency executive: Dr Michael Lim, Director
- Parent agency: Civil Aviation Authority of Singapore
- Website: saa.caas.gov.sg

The Singapore Aviation Academy (SAA) is the primary educational and training facility of the Civil Aviation Authority of Singapore.

== History ==
Singapore Aviation Academy was established in 1958 at Paya Lebar Air Base. In 1972 the school was relocated to larger facilities at Seletar Airport under the new name Civil Aviation Training Centre (CATC). The CATS was renamed as the Singapore Aviation Academy in 1990.

== Training ==
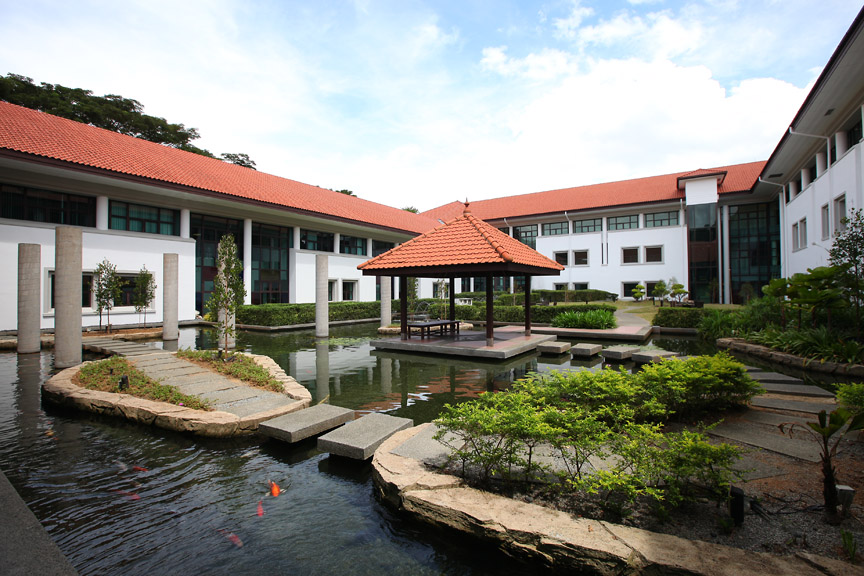
Patio with a pond inside the Singapore Aviation Academy

SAA offers training to civil aviation personnel in Singapore as well as overseas in the areas of aviation management, aviation safety and security, air traffic services and airport emergency services. Since 1958, SAA has trained over 91,000 participants from 200 countries. Since 2015 SAA became one of the first established by ICAO Regional Training Centres of Excellence.

== Programmes ==
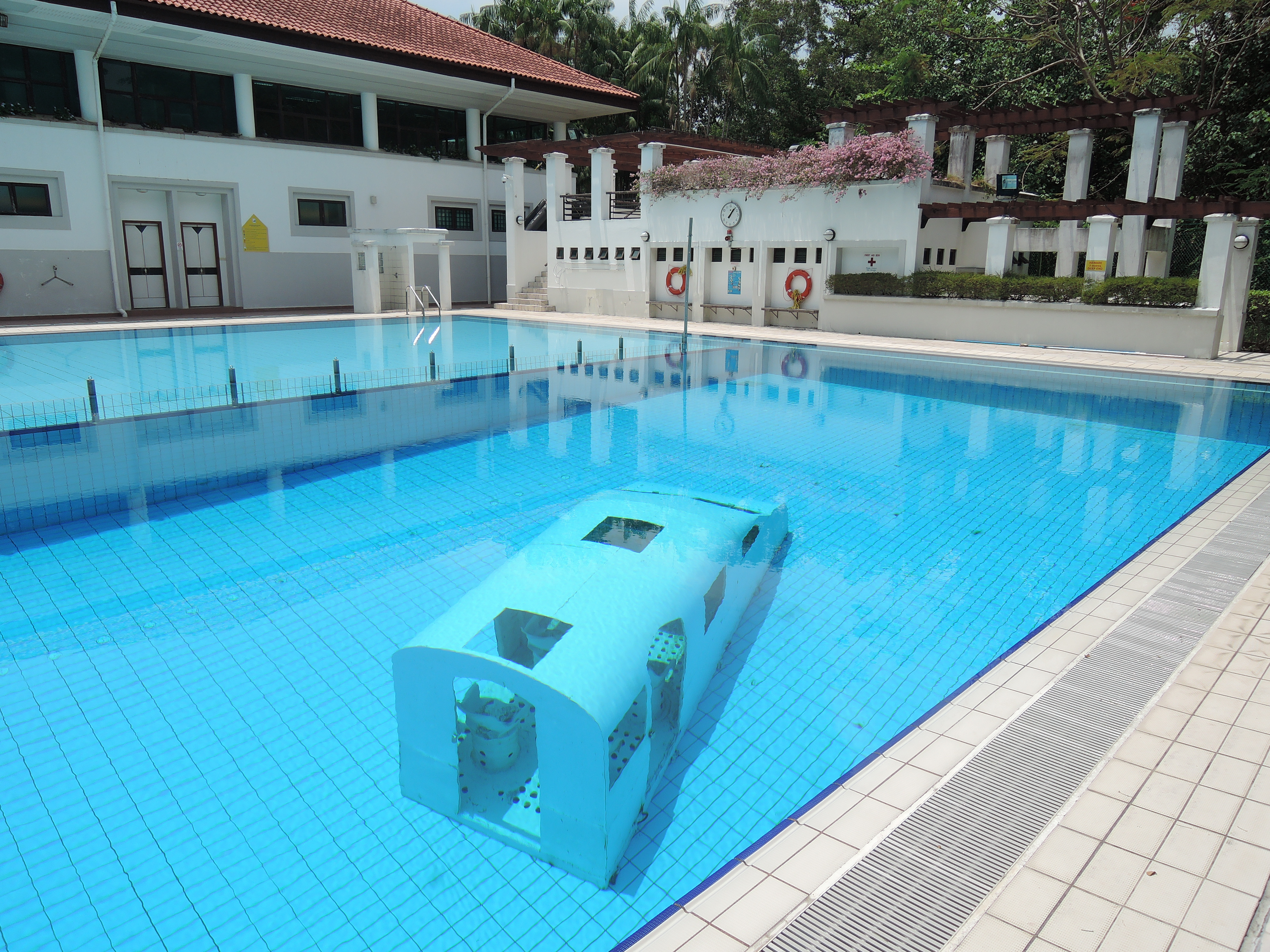
SAA training pool for rescuing people on board aircraft in case of ditching

Main courses are:

- Master of Science in Aeronautics
- Master of Science in Air Transport Management

Academy also offers:

- Bachelors (on-line studies)
- MBAs and PhDs
- Postgraduate Diplomas (on-line studies)

SAA is ISO 9001 certified for quality assurance in design and conduct of its training programmes. The Academy’s training programmes deal with solutions to meeting ICAO's standards and recommended practices.

== Awards ==
Year	Award
2011	TRAINAIR Plus Award
2000	34th Edward Warner Award
1996	Flight International Aerospace Industry Award
1977	Centre of Excellence

== See also ==
- Changi Airport
- List of schools in Singapore
