= Kelong =

Offshore platform in Malaysia

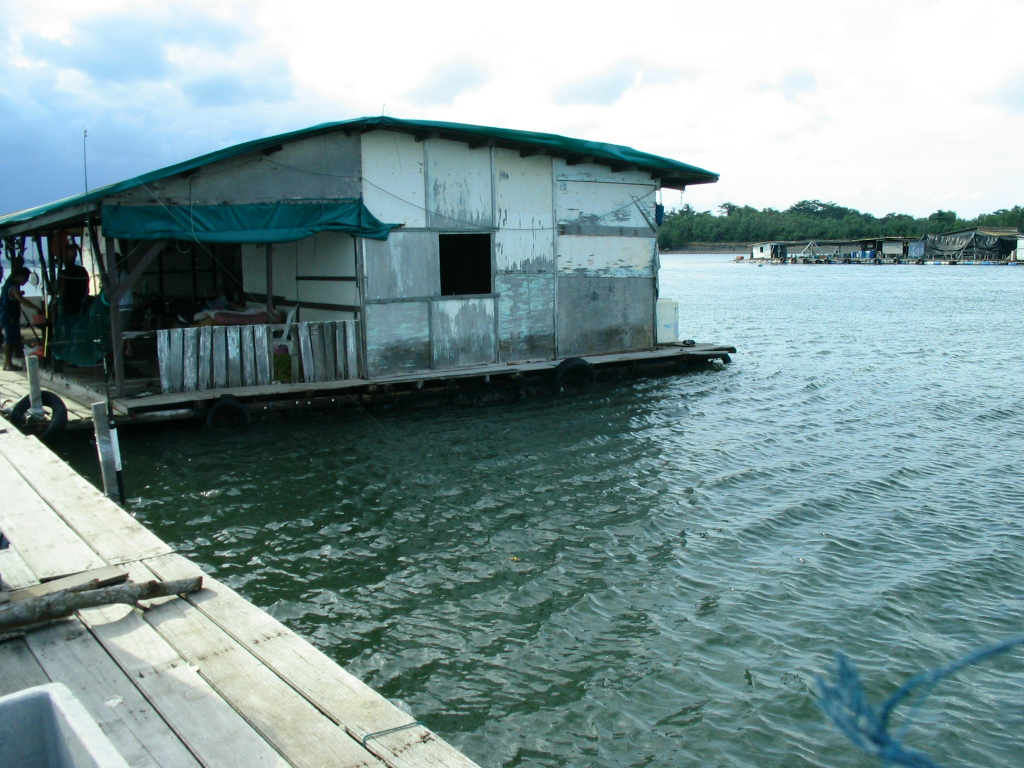
A kelong, 2006

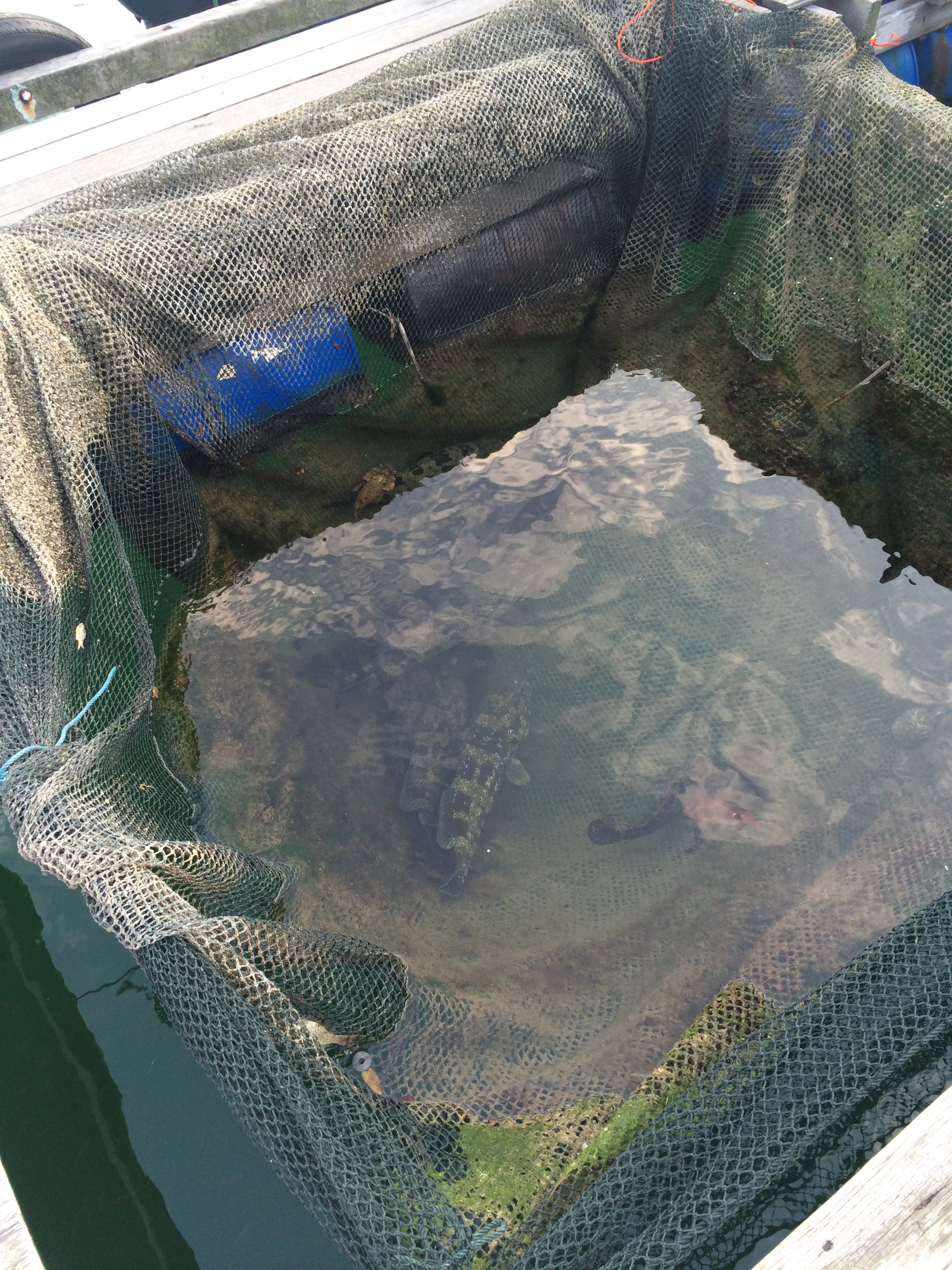
Live fish storage

A kelong (or kellong) is an offshore platform built predominantly with wood, which can be found in waters off Malaysia, the Philippines and Indonesia. Only a handful remain around Singapore due to rapid urbanisation.

Kelongs are built by fishermen primarily for fishing or fish farming purposes, although larger structures can also function as dwellings for them and their families.

Structurally, kelongs are often built without the need for nails, using rattan to bind tree trunks and wooden planks together. The decks of some kelongs have open spaces with nets that hang partially in the water, allowing for captured fish to be kept live until they are sold or cooked. Anchored into the sea bed using wooden piles of about 20 m in length and driven about six metres into the sea, they are usually sited in shallow water, although some can be found in deeper waters. Some kelongs are less isolated and are connected to land via a wooden gangway. Other variants of kelongs can be mobile, with some portion of the building floating freely. Some buildings are large, being made up of groups of kelongs joined together into a massive offshore community.

== Singapore ==
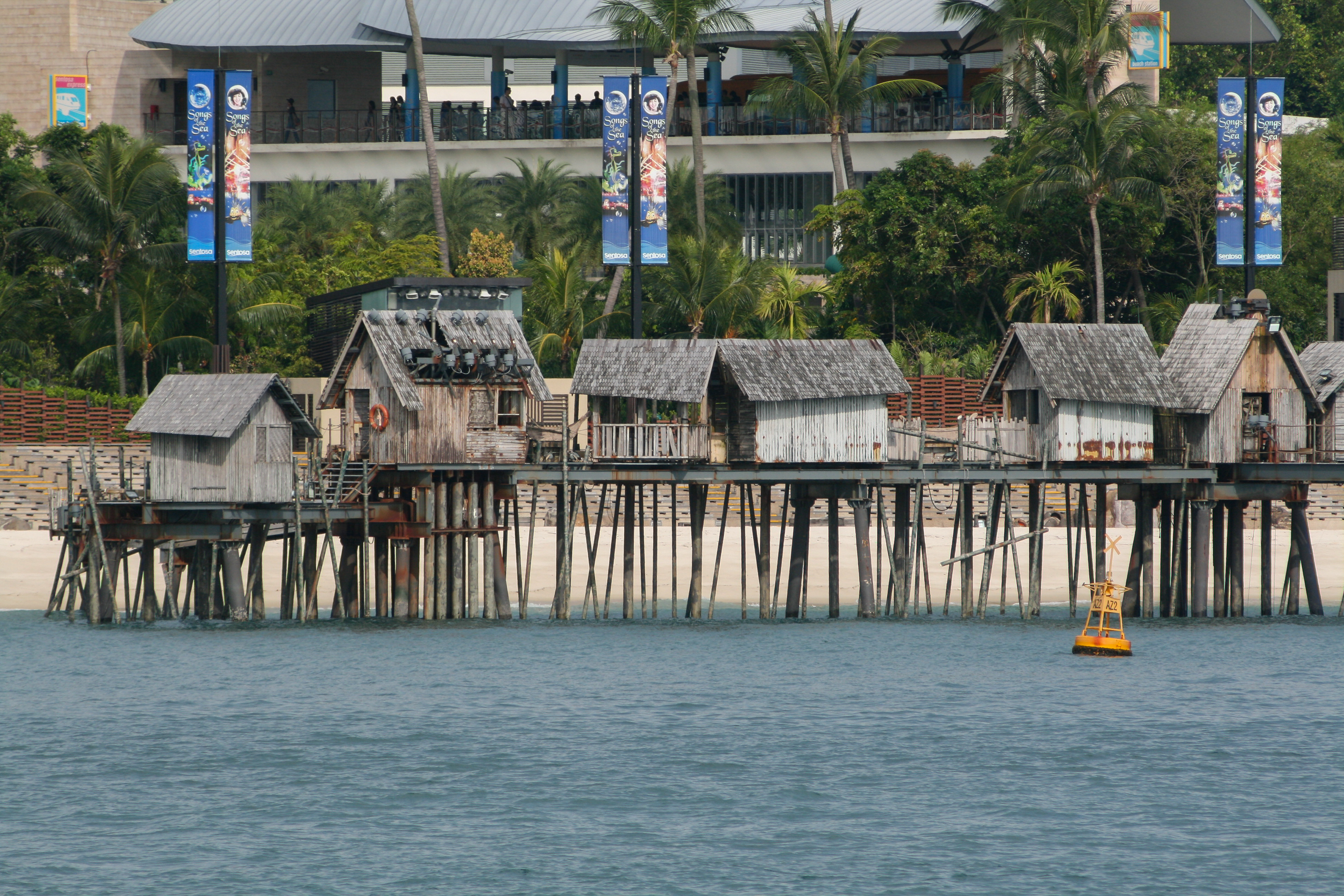
Kelongs in Singapore

Kelongs can be found in the northeastern coastal areas. Kelongs began to decline in Singapore during the 1960s due to falling fish stocks, and with the rise of fish farming in the 1980s. The Singapore government stopped issuing new kelong licences in 1965. Research has put the peak number of kelong licences in Singapore at 310 as of 1952, when kelongs comprised approximately 70% of Singaporean fish production. As of 2024 only four licensed kelongs remain, and the government has declined to allow the transfer of such licences, requiring licensees who wish to exit the business to shut down their kelong instead of transferring it to a new owner. Activists have sought permission to maintain such kelongs as part of Singapore's cultural heritage, instead of shutting them down.
