= List of dams and reservoirs in Singapore =

The following is a list of reservoirs in Singapore.

There are currently 17 reservoirs which are designated as national water catchment areas and are managed by the Public Utilities Board (PUB) of Singapore.

== Reservoirs ==
Name	Surface area (total)	Storage capacity (m^{3})	Period of construction	Construction order	Image	Remarks
Bedok Reservoir	88 ha	12,800,000	1981-1986	14		
Jurong Lake	70 ha			11		In addition to a number of artificial islands such as the Chinese and Japanese Gardens, Jurong Lake is planned to be a future recreational hub for the western side of the island.
Kranji Reservoir	450 ha	15,850,000	1971-1975	5		
Lower Peirce Reservoir (formerly called "Kallang River Reservoir" and "Peirce Reservoir")	6 ha	2,800,000	1900-1912	2		Source of the Kallang River, Singapore's longest river. Connects to Upper Thomson Road by a waterside trail.
Lower Seletar Reservoir	360 ha	9,400,000	1941-1969	13		
MacRitchie Reservoir (formerly called "Thomson Road Reservoir")		4,200,000	1890-1894	1		
Marina Reservoir	240 ha		2005-2008	15		
Murai Reservoir (Note: Located in SAF restricted zone. Strictly no unauthorised entry, photography or filming in these premises. Deadly force may be used against any trespassers.)			1977-1981	7		
Pandan Reservoir			1971-1974	6		
Poyan Reservoir			1977-1981	8		
Pulau Tekong Reservoir			1977-1979	12		
Punggol Reservoir				16		Opening ceremony held on 3 July 2011. Together with Serangoon Reservoir will increase catchment area by 5,500ha.
Sarimbun Reservoir			1977-1981	9		
Serangoon Reservoir				17		Opening ceremony held on 3 July 2011. Together with Punggol Reservoir will increase catchment area by 5,500ha.
Tengeh Reservoir			1977-1981	10		
Upper Peirce Reservoir	304 ha	27,800,000		4		
Upper Seletar Reservoir (formerly called "Seletar Reservoir")	324 ha			3		

== Reservoirs that are no longer in service ==
- Mount Emily Reservoir
- Keppel Hill Reservoir
