= Mount Emily (disambiguation) =

Mount Emily is a mountain in the Klamath Mountains, southwestern Oregon in the US.

Mount Emily may also refer to:

- Mount Emily (Antarctica), rock at Mount Cecily, Antarctica
- Mount Emily (Union County, Oregon), in the Blue Mountains of northeastern Oregon, United States
- Mount Emily Park, park in Singapore
- Mount Emily Reservoir, reservoir in Singapore
- Mount Emily Swimming Pool, swimming pool in Singapore
