= Peirce Reservoir =

Pierce Reservoir may refer to:

- Upper Peirce Reservoir
- Lower Peirce Reservoir
