= List of service reservoirs in Singapore =

The following is a list of service reservoirs in Singapore. There are currently 9 service reservoirs operating in Singapore which are used to store potable water.

== Changi Creek Reservoir ==
Changi Creek Reservoir
- Location within Singapore
- Coordinates: 1°23′11″N 103°59′42″E
- Type: reservoir
- Basin countries: Singapore

Changi Creek Reservoir is a small service reservoir located to the north of Singapore Changi Airport in Singapore. The reservoir supplements and provides backup water supply for the airport. It was formed by damming the headwaters of a small river, Changi Creek, which empties into Sungei Changi and thence into the Serangoon Harbour.

Rainfall from the runways and surrounding green areas is collected in the nearby South End Reservoir. Changi Creek Reservoir is used to balance flows during incoming tides and high rainfall.

== Fort Canning Service Reservoir ==
Fort Canning Reservoir
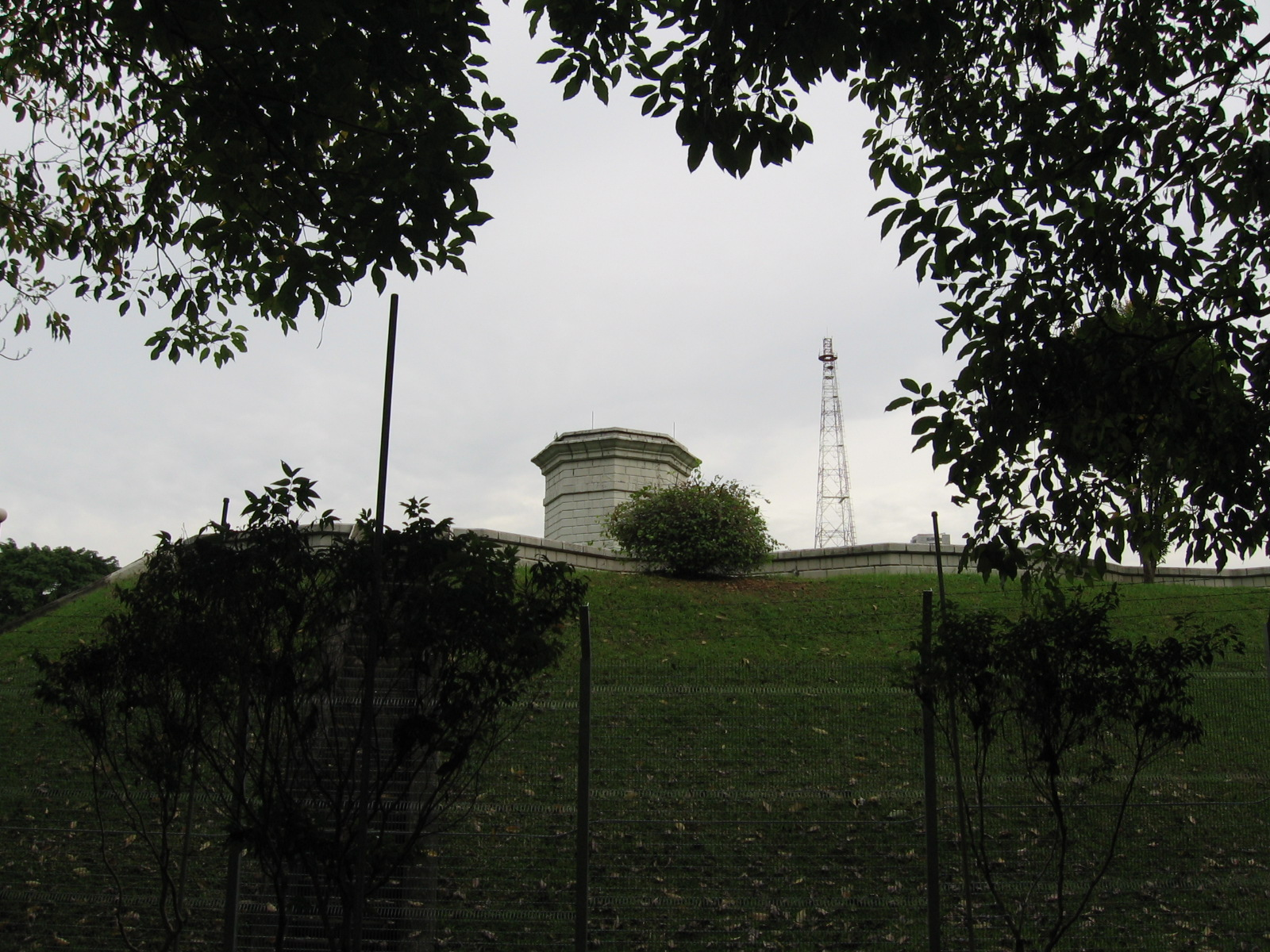
- Fort Canning Service Reservoir

- Location within Singapore
- Location: Fort Canning Singapore
- Coordinates: 1°17′37″N 103°50′48″E
- Type: Reservoir
- Basin countries: Singapore
- Built: 1927
- Surface area: 27,875.5 square metres (300,049 sq ft)

The Fort Canning Service Reservoir (Chinese: 福康宁备水池) is an underground reservoir located on top of Fort Canning Hill. Construction of the reservoir began on 1 April 1927 on the former site of a large artillery barracks and parade ground to help supplement the large impounding reservoirs. The reservoir was constructed in two sections: the southern section was ready for water storage by 1 August 1928, and the final work completed by the middle of January 1929. Water is pumped from the large reservoirs into the service reservoirs, thus enabling water to flow down the hill into houses.

Earlier service reservoirs were built on Mount Emily (1878), Pearl's Hill (1903), and Bukit Timah Hill. The size of the Fort Canning Reservoir is 30 million gallons.

A spring used to exist on the west side of Fort Canning Hill and served as a source of water in the early days of Singapore. The spring was called pancur larangan or "forbidden spring", where the women of the ruler's household were said to bathe in ancient times. In early 19th century Singapore, the spring was used to provide clean drinking water for all ships stopping at the port until the demand exceeded the capacity by 1830. The spring then dried up as wells were dug around the hill. A cache of Javanese-style gold ornaments dating to the mid-14th century was discovered when workers were excavating for the reservoir at Fort Canning in 1928.

== Jalan Eunos Service Reservoir ==
Jalan Eunos Service Reservoir is a service reservoir located along Kaki Bukit Avenue 4 in Singapore. It is found in the northern part of Kaki Bukit estate near the Paya Lebar Air Base and is therefore part of the Bedok planning area. The reservoir provides water supply to the eastern regions of Singapore and stores treated water mainly from Bedok Reservoir. It can reportedly hold 22 million gallons/ 100,000 cubic metres of water. Access to this service reservoir is restricted unlike the neighbouring Bedok Reservoir.

Jalan Eunos Service Reservoir was first constructed by the British Government in 1956 at an estimated cost of $4 million to improve water pressure in the Geylang, Katong and Changi areas of Singapore, as the Woodleigh Waterworks, constructed in 1912 and still stands today, was inadequate to channel water to the growing population. The reservoir was first expanded in 1971 and was then expanded again in 1974 to increase water supply to the east of Singapore which was developing rapidly and was in need of connection to potable water. As Singapore had gained independence by then, there were also fears that Malaysia would eventually cut off water supply from its reservoirs despite agreements made beforehand. In line with the need of Singapore for self reliance to provide its own water, Bedok Reservoir was then finally completed in 1985 to provide Jalan Eunos Service Reservoir with even more water especially to the residences residing in the east of Singapore. Redevelopments in the area of Kaki Bukit also saw Jalan Eunos which was once linked to the reservoir no longer anywhere near it.

== Kallang Service Reservoir ==
Kallang Service Reservoir, also called Bukit Kalang Service Reservoir, is a service reservoir located within the Central Water Catchment. It is situated south of the Lower Pierce Reservoir, off Island Club Road.

Though called Kallang Service Reservoir, it is located nowhere near to Kallang. It is, however, located within the former Ulu Kallang mukim, as well as within the vicinity of the Bukit Kallang geographic point.

== Murnane Service Reservoir ==
Aerial photo of Murnane Service Reservoir 1958 from New Zealand Engineering

Murnane Service Reservoir is a covered service reservoir near the Bukit Timah Expressway and the Pan Island Expressway in Singapore. The reservoir supplements and provides backup water supply for the western regions of Singapore. Covering an area of 13 acres, it was believed to be the largest covered service reservoir in the world when it was completed in 1956.

The reservoir is named after D. J. Murnane, the longest serving Municipal Water Engineer in Singapore. Its planning began immediately after World War II.

In 2014 the Public Utilities Board announced plans for the Murnane Pipeline project, a new 22km long underground water main running from the Murnane Reservoir to Tanjong Pagar in order to meet future demand, which was expected to double from 30 million gallons per day (mgd) to 60 mgd by 2060. The project was expected to be completed in Q3 2022, and appears to have been completed - to little fanfare - as PUB has since mentioned its completion in a press release in September 2023 about a hike in water prices.

== Pearl's Hill Service Reservoir ==
The Pearl's Hill Service reservoir was first mooted in 1897, then built in 1898 to provide additional storage capacity and increase water pressure to Chinatown. The project was described in some detail in a 1902 newspaper report, which highlighted the rapid growth in water demand from 4.1 mgd (average) in May 1900 to 5.4 mgd in 1902. Built of granite and concrete at a cost of $300,000, it was 70 feet higher than the Wilkie Road reservoir which it replaced. The work was undertaken by Municipal Water Engineer Robert Peirce (engineer) and his assistant L M Bell.

Upon completion there were newspaper reports of concerns about the construction quality, stability and leakages from the reservoir. The fact that the reservoir was constructed on top of the hill, rather than sunken into the hill (like Fort Canning reservoir), appears to have been the crux of the public concern.

When filtered water was first imported from Gunong Pulau in Johor in 1929, it was stored in Pearl's Hill Reservoir.

== South End Reservoir ==
The South End Reservoir is a small service reservoir located to the south of Singapore Changi Airport in Singapore. Rainfall from the runways and surrounding green areas is collected in the reservoir and used for fire-fighting drills and toilet flushing. The reservoir supplies 28–33% of the airport's water and saves the airport around S$390,000 per year. It is linked to the Changi Creek Reservoir to balance flows during incoming tides and high rainfall.

== Yishun Pond Park ==
The pond in Yishun Pond Park is a service reservoir which acts as a water catchment area.
