= Reservoir Park =

Reservoir Park may refer to:

== Asia ==
- Lower Peirce Reservoir Park in Singapore
- Upper Peirce Reservoir Park in Singapore
- Wong Nai Chung Reservoir Park in Hong Kong

== Australia ==
- Greenvale Reservoir Park in Melbourne, Victoria
- Reservoir Park, Adelaide Park Lands in Adelaide, South Australia

== United States ==
- Pleasant Grove Reservoir Park in Plant City, Florida
- Reservoir Park (Illinois) in Springfield, Illinois
- Reservoir Park (Massachusetts) in Brookline, Massachusetts
- Reservoir Park (Pennsylvania) in Harrisburg, Pennsylvania
- Reservoir State Park in Lewiston, New York
