= Central Catchment Area =

- Planning Area

Other transcription(s)
  - Chinese: 中央集水区 (Simplified) 中央集水區 (Traditional); Zhōngyāng Jíshuǐqū (Pinyin); Tiong-iong Chi̍p-chúi-khu (Hokkien POJ)
  - Malay: Kawasan Tadahan Air Tengah (Rumi) کاوسن تادهن اءير تڠه (Jawi)
  - Tamil: மத்திய நீர் நீர்ப்பிடிப்பு Mattiya nīr nīrppiṭippu (Transliteration)
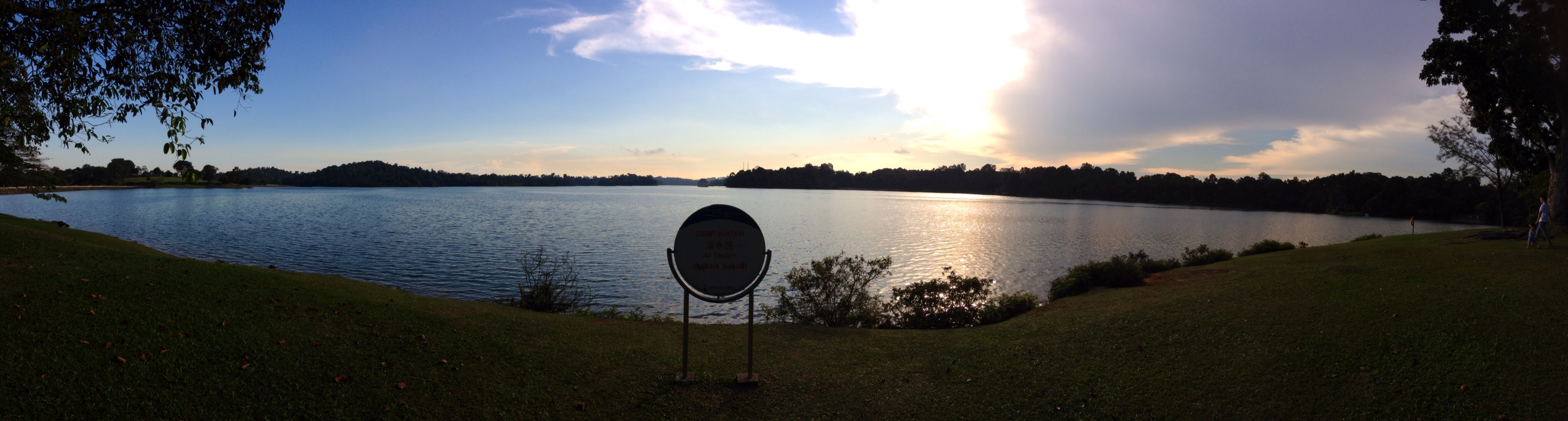
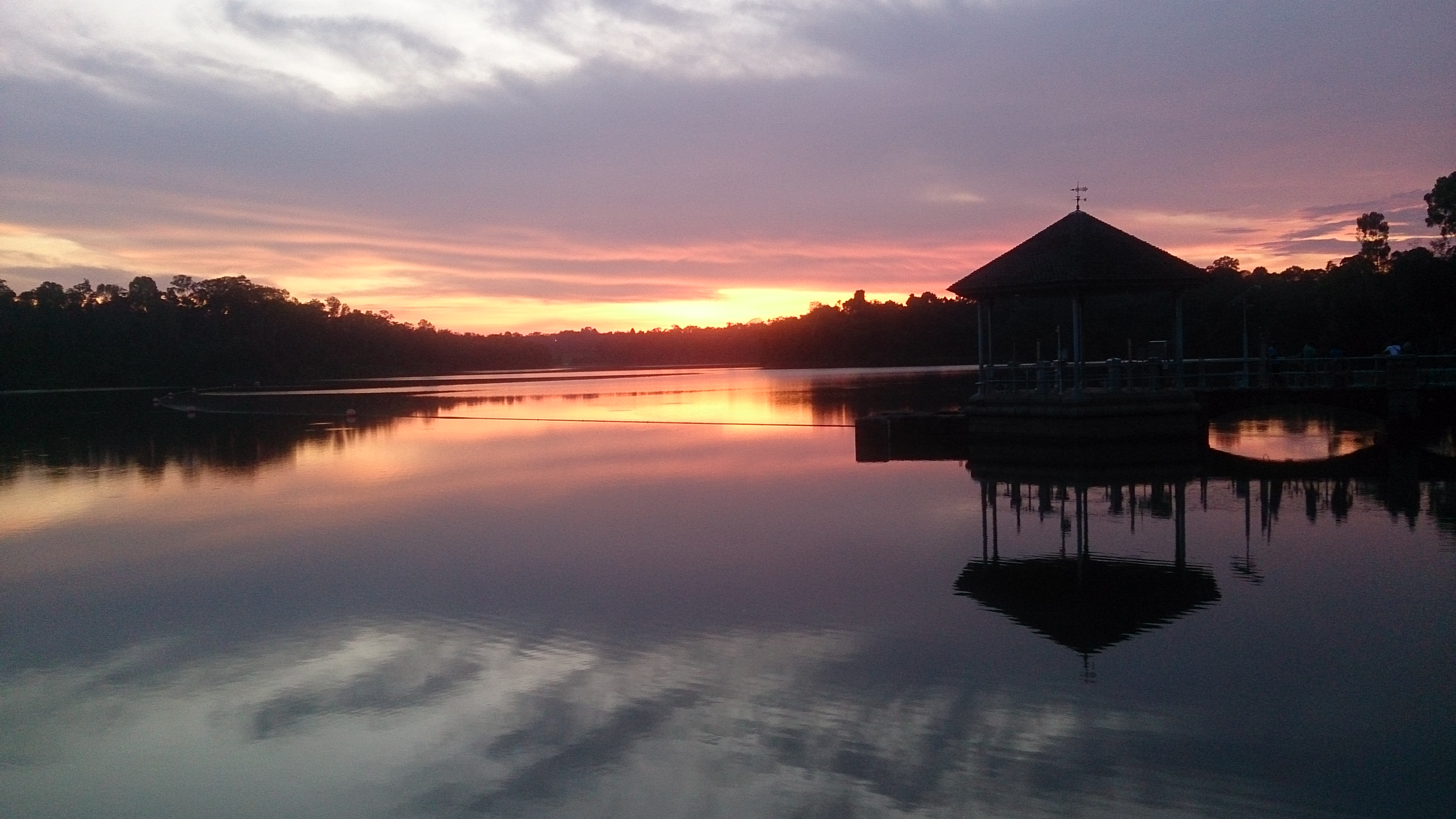
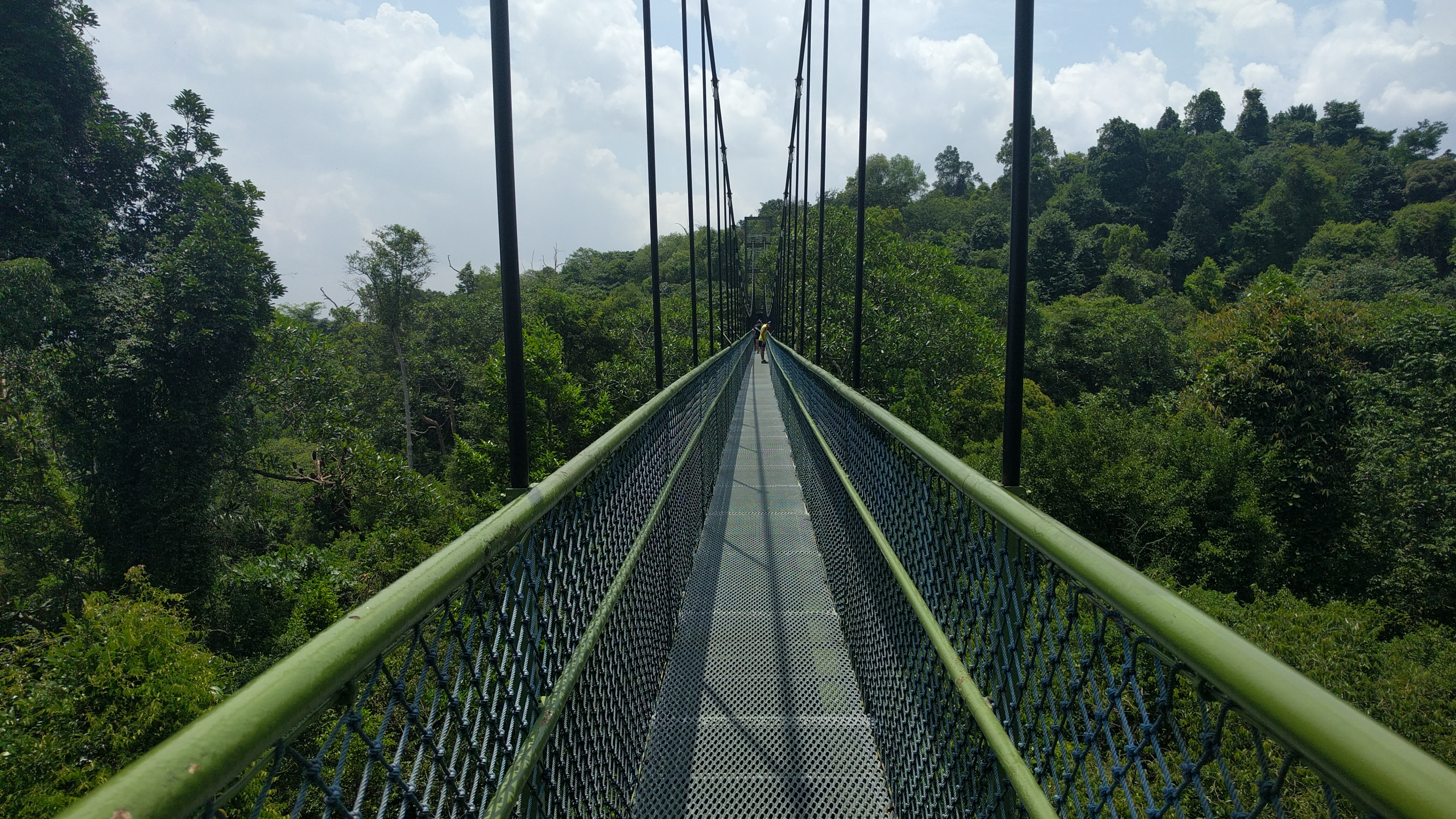
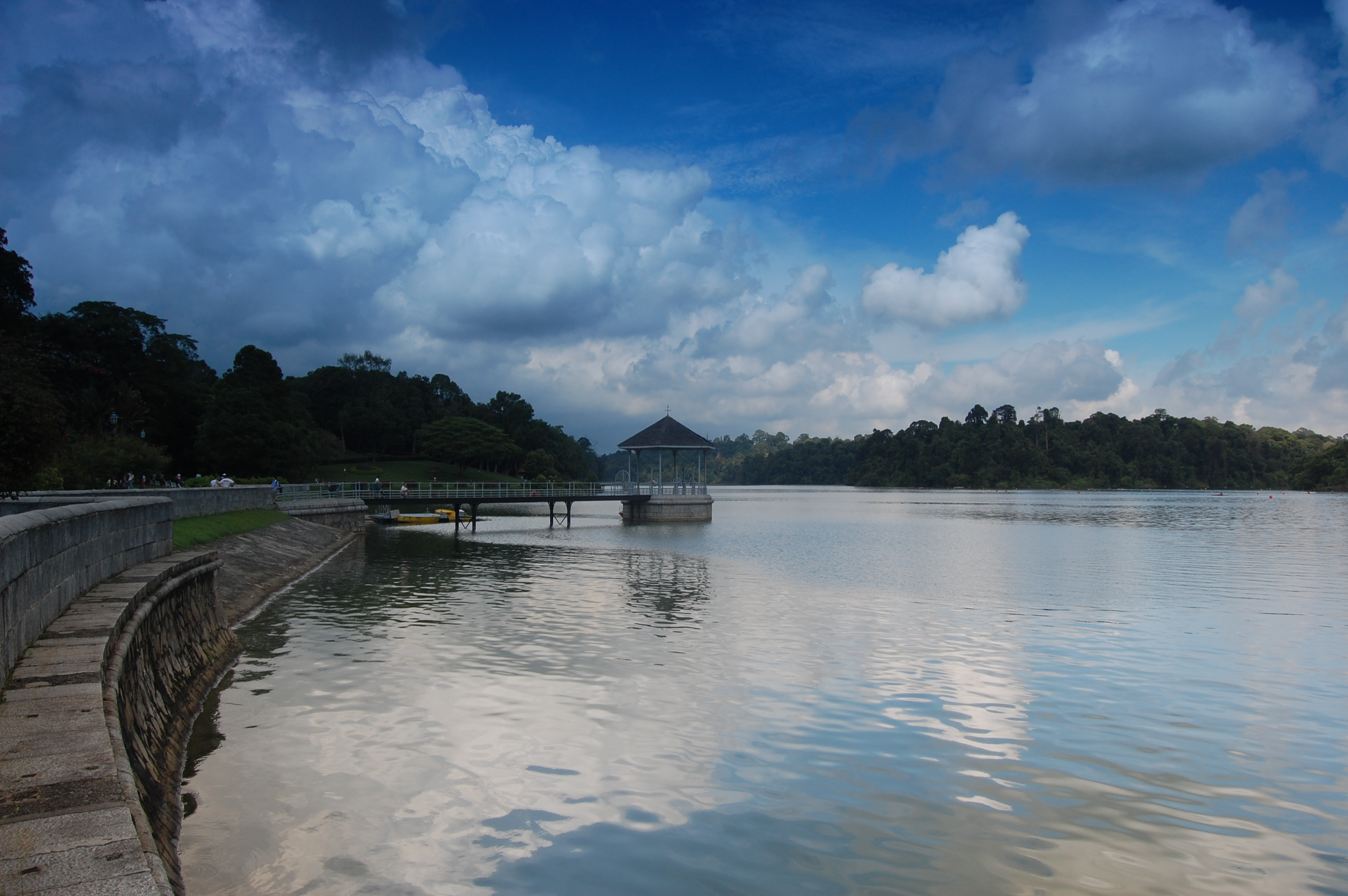
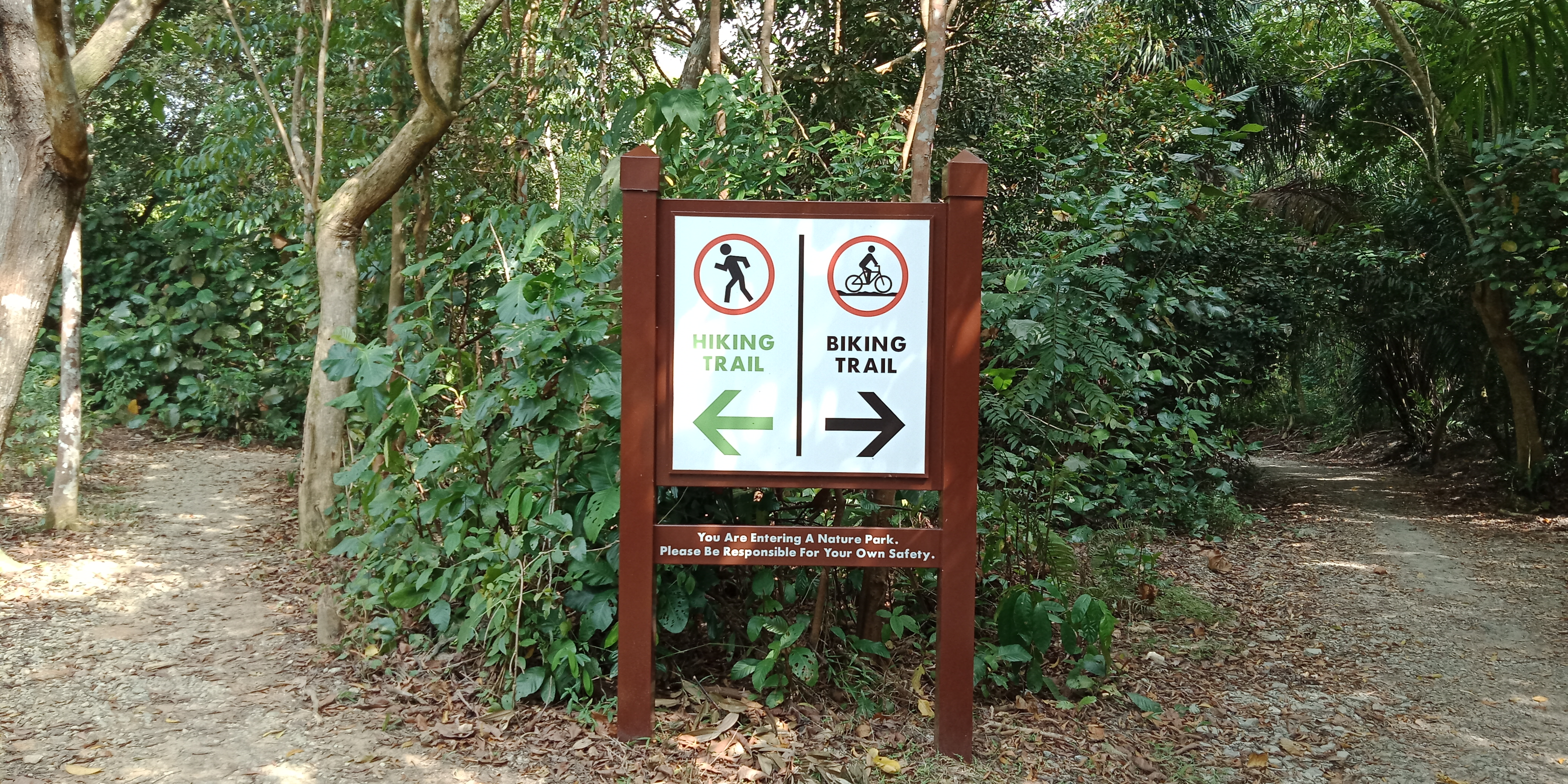
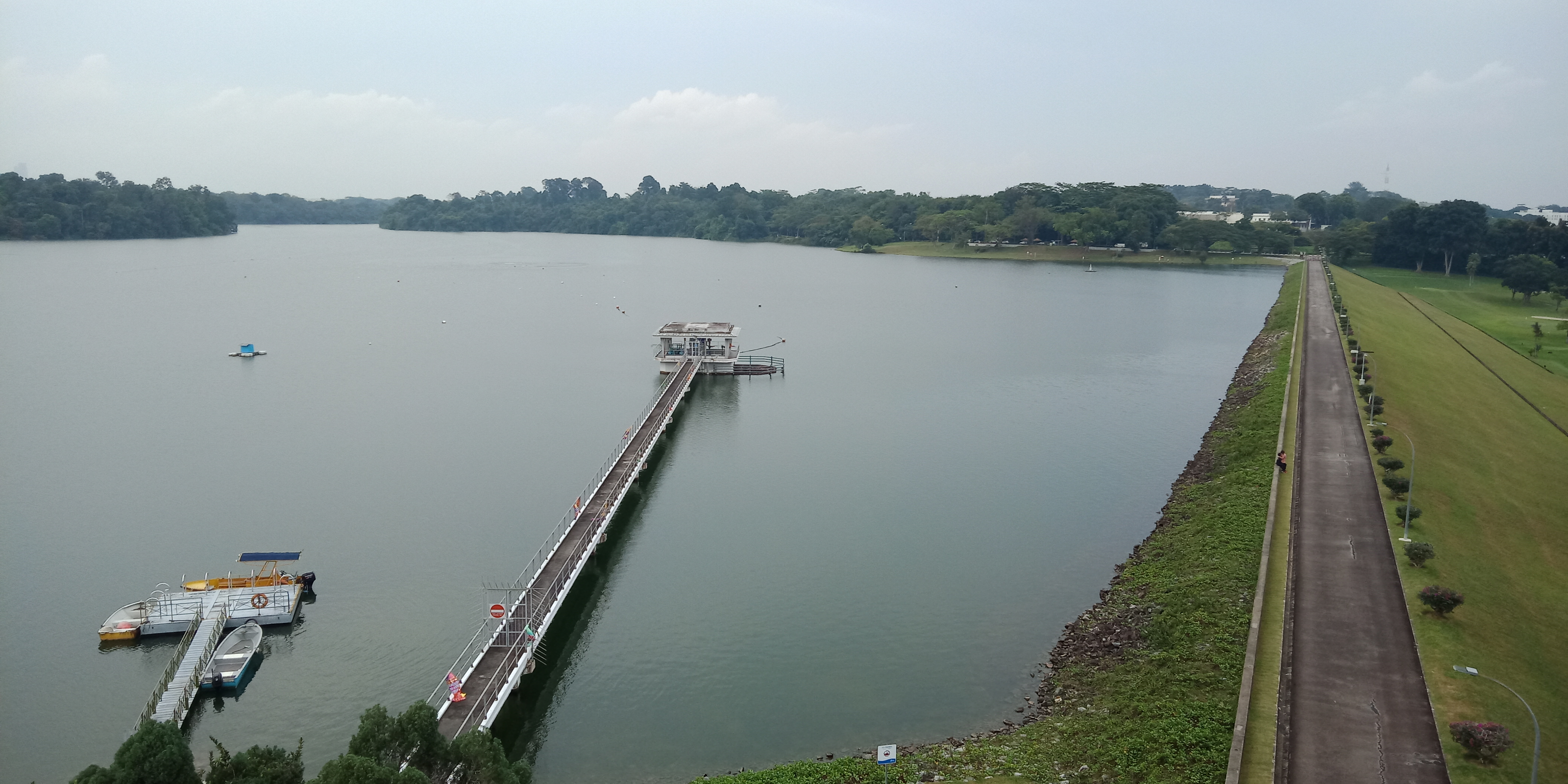
- From top left to right: Panoramic view of Upper Peirce Reservoir, Sunset at Lower Peirce Reservoir, TreeTop Walk, MacRitchie Reservoir Park, Chestnut Nature Park, Upper Seletar Reservoir

- Location of the Central Catchment Area in Singapore
- Coordinates: 01°22′N 103°48′E
- Country: Singapore
- Region: North Region
- CDC: North West CDC; Central CDC
- Town councils: Holland-Bukit Panjang Town Council; Bishan-Toa Payoh Town Council
- Constituencies: Holland-Bukit Timah GRC; Bishan-Toa Payoh GRC

Government
  - Mayor: North West CDC: Alex Yam; Central CDC: Denise Phua
  - Members of Parliament: Holland-Bukit Timah GRC: Edward Chia; Bishan-Toa Payoh GRC: Chee Hong Tat

Area
  - Total: 37.2 km^{2} (14.4 sq mi)
  - Rank: 6th
- Postal district: 25

The Central Catchment Area, also known as the Central Water Catchment, is a designated planning area and one of the two main water catchments of Singapore. The country's main reservoirs—MacRitchie, Upper Seletar, Upper Peirce, and Lower Peirce—are in the central catchment area.

The Central Catchment Area lies in the geographical centre of the city and is largely home to the Central Catchment Nature Reserve, which houses several other recreational sites, including the Singapore Zoo, the Night Safari, and the River Safari.

== Wildlife ==
MacRitchie Reservoir has resident animals such as birds, monkeys, and monitor lizards. The Treetop Walk, a one-way suspension bridge, is a popular attraction for birdwatchers and tourists.

The monkeys at MacRitchie Reservoir are infamous for attacking people out of aggression and in search of food. These attacks have occasionally led to injuries among visitors. The National Parks Board has put up signs all over the reservoir, instructing people on what to do when they encounter monkeys.

Birds such as the white-bellied sea eagle can be found in the Upper Seletar Reservoir.
