= David J. Murnane =

Singaporean civil engineer

David Joseph Murnane (1892–1953) was Singapore's longest serving municipal water engineer, serving from 1925 to 1947.

== Early life ==
Born in Coolock, Dublin, Ireland in 1892, Murnane was the third son of David and Mary (née Cummins) Murnane. At the time of the 1901 census the family lived in Carrick-on-Suir, Co. Tipperary; their religion was recorded as Roman Catholic and the father's occupation was given as head constable in the Royal Irish Constabulary.

Murnane joined the Royal Engineers and served in Gallipoli in the World War I; there he suffered typhoid as a result of drinking water from poisoned wells. As 2nd Lieutenant, he was commended for conspicuous gallantry in action in 1916 and was awarded the Military Cross. His rank was given as Captain according to a National Archives online record.

An engineering graduate of Queen's University Belfast, when he applied for membership of the Institution of Civil Engineers in 1917 he gave his home address as Dunsany, Co. Meath.

== Work on Singapore water supply projects ==
Murnane joined the Municipal Water Department in February 1920 and became the head of the department in 1925. Significantly, during his time, Singapore began importing water from Gunong Pulai in Johor (now part of Malaysia). Under an agreement with the Sultan of Johore, raw water began to flow on 2 June 1927 and, as a result, the "danger of a water famine in Singapore ... had practically disappeared". Filtered water from newly built reservoirs and filters in Gunong Pulai began to flow on 31 December 1929. This water flowed by gravity to the Pearl's Hill Reservoir about 33 miles away. At that time the population of Singapore was 525,000 and water consumption was 16.5 million gallons per day. The total project cost was $16.2 million, a tremendous investment which would cause Singapore water rates to be the highest in Malaya.

Arguably, the Gunong Pulai water supply project was the most significant public infrastructure project undertaken in water-scarce Singapore. It was reviewed favourably in 1928 by a visiting independent commissioner from Burma who said it was the biggest municipal project he had heard of in the region. The Municipal Treasurer reported in 1930 that he found the project was managed to a very high standard in terms of financial controls. For photographs of the Sultan Ibrahim reservoir at Gunong Pulai, which was handed back by the Singapore Public Utilities Board to Malaysia in 2011, including the commemorative plaque with the names of the key engineering staff, click through the footnote

By 1938 Singapore needed additional water supply for the growing population and Murnane was responsible for the long term planning: 'many a water-works engineer spends his time carrying out the plans of his predecessor and thinking out the work to be done by his successor'. Murnane proposed a major $5.5 million investment which involved a new 39" duplicate pipeline from Gunong Pulai to Singapore, a doubling of water treatment capacity in the Johor reservoirs, and the building of a large new permanent reservoir in Seletar in Singapore. By this date water consumption in Singapore was 21 million gallons per day. The Straits Times on 2 April 1939 has photos of construction work including one of Murnane supervising the works which involved 1,400 workers installing 2 1/2-ton lengths of pipe.

Murnane was already planning a second major water supply project in Johor, this time tapping the Johore river near Kota Tinggi. He oversaw a one-year experiment which demonstrated the river water could be turned into "pure sparkling drinking water". The municipality of Singapore either approved or was about to approve the project in 1941 but stopped because of the war. After the war Murnane made the case for the $40 million investment in the Johor river water supply project which was ultimately undertaken by his successor F. G. Hill.

== Reflections on Singapore water supply and comparisons with other cities in Asia ==
Murnane gave a talk to the Singapore Rotary Club in 1932 about 'the most plentiful thing on earth' i.e. water. He told his audience that 'the traveller coming to Singapore is surprised to hear that we drink water from the tap; it is something unusual for this part of the world'. He ended with the surprising statement that 'No town in the world takes greater precautions to ensure the purity of its [water] supply [than Singapore]; no town in the world has a purer or safer supply [than Singapore]'. In a vote of thanks the municipal water engineer was described as 'the one man who is probably more responsible than any other for our health, which is the keystone of our happiness.'

Under Murnane, the quality of the water supply improved. All mains water in Singapore was filtered for the first time in 1927 and he dealt with the problem of seasonal water discolouration around the same time. One of his first annual reports (1927) was 'voluminous having no less than 19 tables not to mention charts and appendices'. At the end of his career he declared that water purity was tested '50–60 times daily' and was always found to be pure.

The Water Department pursued its own research and development and in 1932 Murnane reported excellent test results of a specially-made rubber water pipe that had been submerged in the sea for 2 years. The water department also tested the performance of copper pipes under local conditions and these were approved as safe for use in 1932.

There was public disquiet about Singapore water charges which were the highest of any town in Malaya on account of "the high overhead cost of the Johore supply scheme". For a discussion of the impact of water charges on the poor in Singapore in 1936, a comparison of water charges in towns and cities in Malaya and a discussion on why the water department should not be a profit-oriented trading department, see extensive footnote.

Water meters had begun to be introduced in Singapore by 1902, a year in which the then head of the Water Department, Robert Peirce, faced a serious 'water famine'. By 1935, a flat water meter rental charge of 50 cents per month was being levied on all households, 'a trifling sum to the rich man but a heavy drain on the income of a poor man'.

It is often assumed that Singapore's focus on water conservation and efficiency is a recent phenomenon. According to The Sunday Times of 26 June 1938 (which has a photograph of Murnane and coverage of the major $5.5 million water supply project): "Singapore uses less water per head than any other city in the East. This is not because whisky soda is preferred to whisky ayer (i.e. water), but because the city is fully metered and the people have been trained not to waste water". Consumption was half that of Penang, Bombay and Calcutta and two-thirds that of Shanghai at the time. The water department was committed to data collection and benchmarking itself against other cities, even in the 1930s.

The eve of Chinese New Year had the highest daily water consumption in the year (on account of house cleaning and washing activity) while the first day of Chinese New Year had the lowest consumption. The water department under Murnane undertook major water mains interconnection works on the first day of Chinese New Year.

Murnane was held in high regard as a water engineer and his services were in demand around Asia. He designed the Sandakan, Sabah water supply project in 1929; the Hong Kong government retained him for authoritative advice as a consultant in 1931 and we know he was providing services to the Johore state government in 1940.

David Murnane retired, aged 55, on 10 May 1947 after 27 years' service; it was customary for the local newspaper to summarise the highlights of his career.

== Life outside the Water Department ==
Murnane was a Lieutenant in the Straits Settlements Volunteer Force in 1924. He resigned his commission in 1938.

He was active for many years in the management of The Singapore Municipal Employees Co-operative Thrift and Loan Society Limited. 1932 was not an easy time in Singapore which suffered the effects of the global trade depression. Murnane was active in making an appeal for relief funds in his capacity as President of the Society; he raised $300 monthly through a 20c monthly voluntary contribution from municipal employees to assist indebted members "make the slate clean" and to alleviate "sufferings and even starvation".

Murnane was active in the St Patricks' Society of Singapore during the 1920s and 1930s and was President of the Society in 1937. He was also a member of the general committee at the Island Club.

Murnane was married to Stephanie. They had two daughters, Moira (Moya) and Sheila, and two sons Conn and Niall. In 1939, Sheila was described in glowing terms at a society garden party and there is a newspaper photograph of both sisters as providers of entertainment in aid of a Children's Aid Society benefit at Raffles. While their father was interned by the Japanese in Singapore, Conn was in boarding school in Ireland (Clongowes) and Niall in England (Ampleforth College). Earlier, both the boys and their sisters had attended a Catholic convent boarding school in Boscombe in England from where the two girls went on to school at Mount Anville Secondary School in Dublin. It appears Stephanie spent the war years in Australia.

== Surrender of Singapore by General Percival in 1942 ==
In an effort to slow the Japanese forces' advance into Singapore, Murnane's old regiment, the Royal Engineers, was responsible for destroying the Johor-Singapore Causeway on 31 January 1942. Ironically, when they destroyed the causeway, the Royal Engineers also cut the water pipes that carried water from Gunong Pulai to Singapore, the same pipes installed by Murnane's Water Department in 1927 and 1939.

Leading up to the surrender to the Japanese on 15 February 1942 during World War II, Murnane advised General Arthur Percival on the state of the water supply on 14 February 1942, following extensive Japanese shelling in the city during the Battle of Singapore. Although Japanese forces were by then in control of Bukit Timah hill, as well as MacRitichie and Peirce reservoirs, they did not shut off the water supply to the city, a widespread misconception. According to oral history records, quoted by Louis Allen (author of Singapore 1941–42), Murnane asked for and was promised by General Percival "ten lorries and a hundred Royal Engineers" so he could fix the water supply leaks caused by Japanese bombing and shelling. Allen says Murnane got 'one lorry and ten frightened Sikhs'. When confronted again, all that Percival delivered (on 14 February) was one lorry and ten Royal Engineers but it was too late.

The involvement of David Murnane in the critical final hours before surrender is confirmed by General Percival in his published Despatches, no 567, dated 14 February 1942. In the post-war Percival Report (written in 1946, published in 1948) the "imminent collapse" of the water supply, estimated by Murnane on 14 February to occur within 24–48 hours, was highlighted as a direct cause for surrender.

Murnane remained at his post and was interned at the Changi Prison camp in Singapore during the war. After the war, and recuperation in England, he returned to work whereupon he picked up projects begun before the war, including the expansion of the Gunong Pulai water supply project and the new Johor river water supply project.

== Death ==
Murnane died in 1953 in Newlands, Cape Town, South Africa. Shortly afterwards, it was agreed that the new reservoir on Jalan Kampong Chantek in Singapore would be named in his honour. His newspaper death notice indicates he was a recipient of the Military Cross.

His wife Stephanie died in Cape Town in 1968.

== Legacy ==
The Murnane Service Reservoir, named after him, is a service reservoir located near the Bukit Timah Expressway and the Pan Island Expressway in Singapore. Built at a cost of $5.5 million, the reservoir supplements and provides backup water supply for the western regions of Singapore. The first section, with storage capacity of 16 million gallons, was opened in 1956 by the Singapore Governor Sir Robert Black. At the time, it was 'believed to be the largest covered service reservoir in the world', with eventual capacity of 56 million gallons of water.

There is a detailed engineering description of the reservoir and Singapore's water supply needs in the New Zealand Engineering journal in 1958. The service reservoir was planned immediately after World War II to expand the water supply system from 30 million to 100 million gallons per day. Works started in 1949 and was completed in 1956.

A World Health Organization water sanitation seminar held in Singapore in December 1957 made a field visit to the reservoir. "This is believed to be the biggest covered service reservoir in the world. The reservoir when full carries a 20 ft. depth of water over an area of 13 acres. It is in two sections containing respectively 16 and 40 million gallons, the total being equal to one day's supply to the whole of Singapore. The roof of the reservoir is formed of reinforced concrete arches of 40 ft. 9 in. span and only 3 in. thick, supported on concrete columns. At the time of the visit both sections were empty for cleaning and it was therefore possible for the party to enter the reservoir and appreciate its magnitude."
