= List of waterways in Singapore =

This is the list of waterways and maritime features in Singapore:

== Basins ==
- Benoi Basin
- Gul Basin
- Jurong Basin
- Kallang Basin
- Northern Tuas Basin
- Southern Tuas Basin
- Store Basin
- Telok Ayer Basin (now Shenton Way)

== Bays ==
- Cruise Bay
- Marina Bay

== Channels ==
- Fairburn Channel
- Keppel Channel
- Ketam Channel
- Nenas Channel
- Sebarok Channel
- East Jurong Channel
- West Jurong Channel

== Docks ==
- Dock Number 1
- Dock Number 2
- King George VI Dock
- King's Dock
- Queen's Dock

== Waterways ==
- Jong Waterway
- Sinki Fairway
- Sisters Fairway
- Temasek Fairway
- East Keppel Fairway
- West Keppel Fairway
- Southern Fairway
- Eastern Corridor Fairway
- Eastern Fairway

== Harbours ==
- Keppel Harbour
- Serangoon Harbour

== Lakes ==
See Lakes of Singapore

== Reservoirs ==
See Reservoirs in Singapore

== Rivers ==
See List of rivers in Singapore

== Seas ==
- South China Sea

== Straits ==
- Selat Ayer Merbau
- Selat Banyan
- Selat Berkas
- Selat Biola
- Selat Bukom
- Selat Pandan
- Selat Pauh
- Selat Pawai
- Selat Pesek
- Selat Pulau Damar
- Selat Johor (Straits of Johor)
- Selat Jurong
- Selat Sakra
- Selat Salu
- Selat Samulun
- Selat Sengkir
- Selat Sinki
- Selat Sudong
- Selat Tanjong Hakim
- Singapore Strait (Selat Singapura)
