= Yan Kit =

- Look Yan Kit Chinese dentist
- Chan Yan Kit Hong Kong athlete
