= Syonan Shrine =

Shinto shrine in Singapore

Syonan Jinja Shōnan Shrine 昭南神社
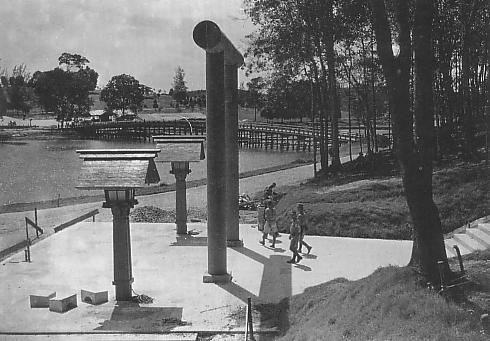
- The near-completed Syonan Jinja in 1942

- Location within Singapore

Religion
- Affiliation: Shinto
- Deity: Amaterasu
- Type: Shinto shrine

Location
- Location: MacRitchie Reservoir, Singapore
- Coordinates: 1°20′53.6″N 103°48′49.7″E

Architecture
- Established: 7 May 1942
- Destroyed: 15 August 1945

Syonan Jinja (昭南神社, Shōnan Jinja; lit. "Shōnan Shrine") was a Shinto shrine at MacRitchie Reservoir, Singapore. Built by the Japanese Imperial Army during the Japanese occupation of Singapore in World War II, the shrine was destroyed directly before British forces re-occupied Singapore.

Located deep inside the Central Catchment Nature Reserve (CCNR), the National Heritage Board (NHB) declared the site a historic site in 2002, although no plans have been made public so far to develop or make any significant changes to the site since the war.

== History ==
The Syonan Jinja (Light of the South Shrine) was envisioned to be a shrine that commemorated the many Japanese soldiers and military personnel who fell in the Japanese conquest of Singapore.

The construction of Syonan Jinja was significant. Major Yasuji Tamura, the commander of the Japanese 5th Division's Engineers Regiment and the man in-charge of the design and the construction of the Syonan Jinja, had envisioned for the shrine in Singapore to be best Shinto shrine in the whole of the southern areas of Asia that has come under Japanese occupation. It was also to be the second-greatest shrine of the Shinto faith after the Meiji Shrine in Tokyo, Japan, which it was modelled after.

The foundation stones were laid by Lieutenant-Colonel Tomoyuki Yamashita in May 1942. Construction started and finished in 1942 with a total area of 470 acres with plans to expand the surrounding land to become a Japanese park with gardens, playgrounds and a stadium. It opened with the grand opening ceremony on 15 February 1943 with the first mayor Shigeo Odate officiating the ceremony. Fundings were also raised in parts from donation, often intimidatingly.

Almost 10,000 British and Australian prisoners-of-war were involved in the construction.

== Destruction ==
Just before the Japanese officially surrendered on 15 August 1945, they decided to destroy and burn the shrine to the ground in fear of its desecration by the returning British colonial forces.

== Preservation ==
The ruins of Syonan Jinja – now down to a few remaining support structures and broken pieces and chunks – can still be found in the dense tropical forest of the Central Catchment Nature Reserve (CCNR), in which includes the MacRitchie Reservoir.

The remnants of the old shrine were designated as a historical site by the NHB in 2002. However, the historical site remains inaccessible to the public due to the strong current deep stream and the presence of wild animals.

== Gallery ==
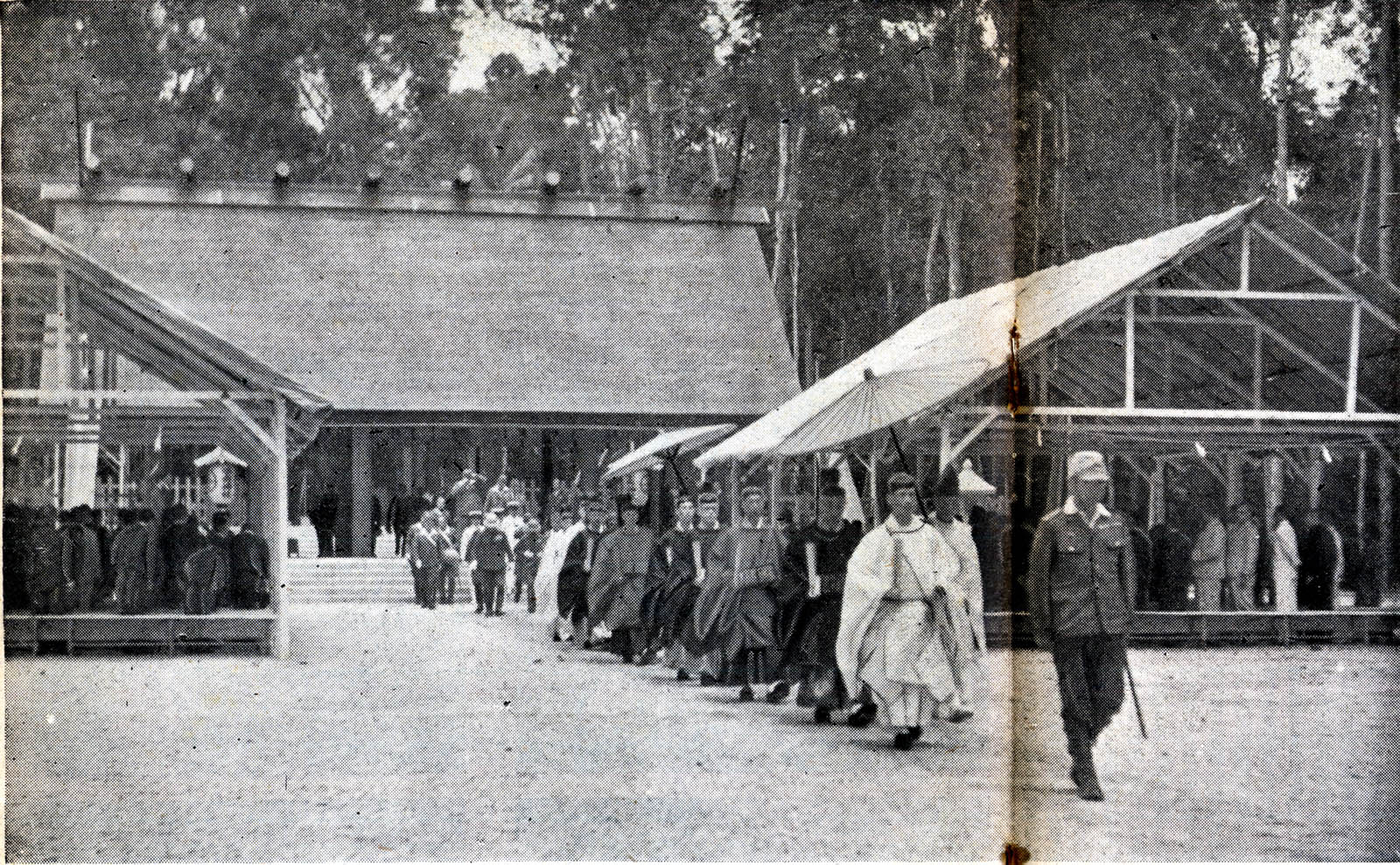
Japanese army and navy officers visiting the Shonan Jinja in 1943

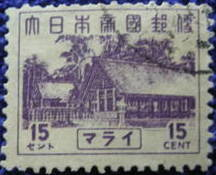
Japanese postage stamp depicting Shonan Jinja

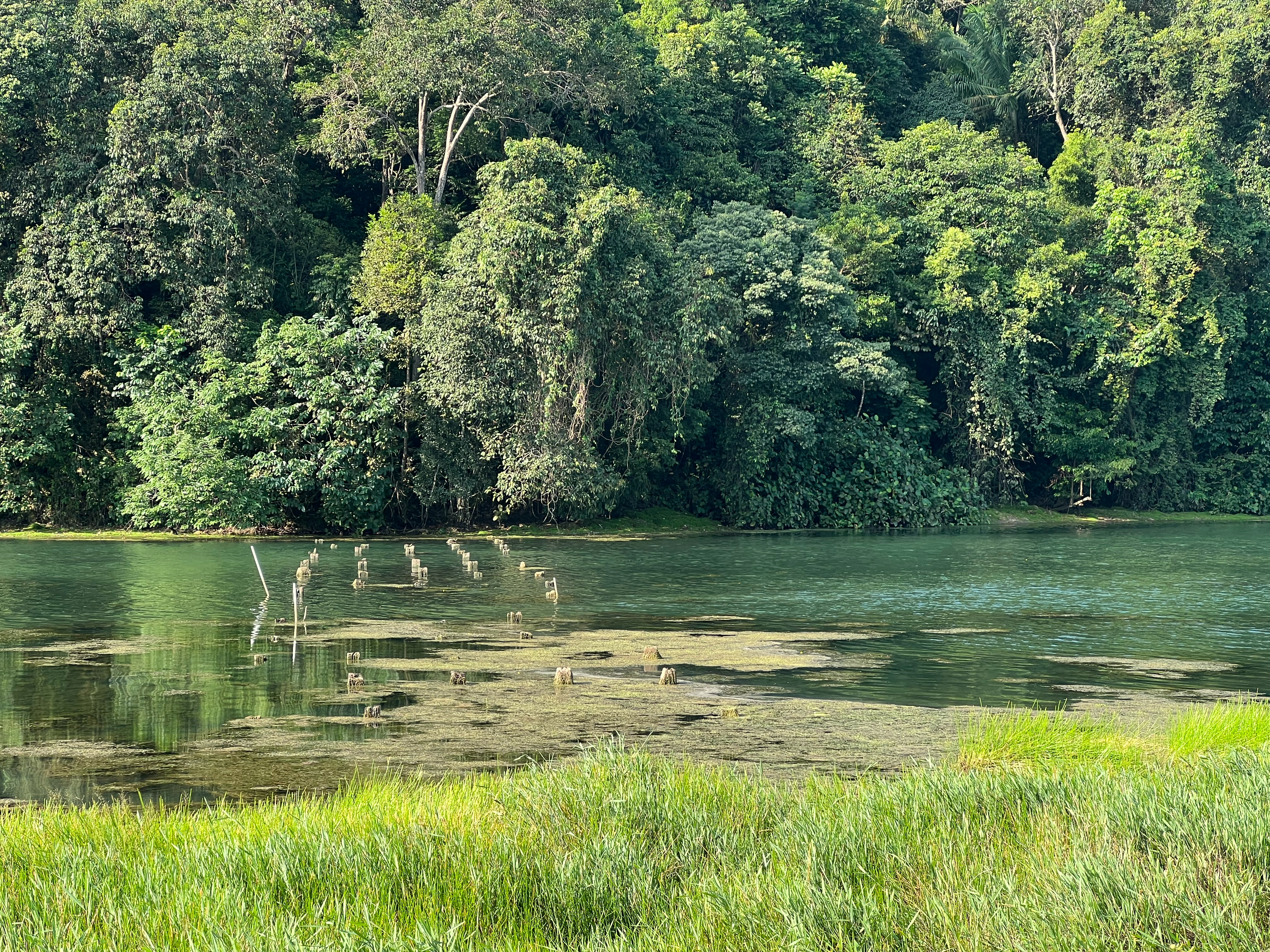
Remains of Divine Bridge leading to Syonan Jinja at MacRitchie Reservoir
