= Mount Emily Reservoir =

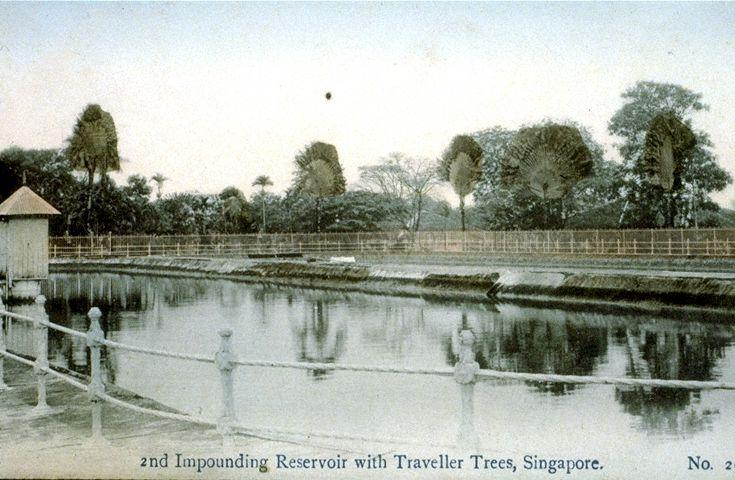
- Postcard image of Mount Emily Reservoir, circa 1911

- Location within Singapore
- Location: Singapore
- Coordinates: 1°18′15″N 103°50′50″E
- Type: Reservoir
- Basin countries: Singapore
- Built: 1878; 148 years ago

Mount Emily Reservoir was a reservoir originally designed to bring water supply to the town of Singapore. It was in operation from 1878 until it was not required with the completion of Fort Canning Reservoir in 1929. It was converted into a swimming pool and was reopened in 1931.

== History ==
Built in 1878, the reservoir was located in what is modern day Mount Emily Park, located in District 9, next to Istana and close to the areas known as Little India and Bugis. The location contained a pumping station which was built in 1878, with the British government building two service reservoirs in the 1880s. Each had a holding capacity of one million gallons which were replaced by a 30 million storage reservoir at Fort Canning in 1929.

The reservoir was also a resort area, surrounded by a park and playground which provided a view of the town. The reservoir became unused beginning in 1929 with the completion of Fort Canning Reservoir which supplied water to the town. In 1929, the Singapore Municipal Commission took over the reservoir and its surrounding areas from the Water Department, and converted the reservoir into a swimming pool and the land as a public park at a recommended budget of $100,000.

== See also ==
- List of dams and reservoirs in Singapore
