= Upper Peirce Reservoir Park =

Park in Central Water Catchment, Singapore

Coordinates: 1°22′22.5″N 103°48′40.0″E

- Location within Singapore
- Location: Singapore
- Area: 5 hectares (12 acres)
- Manager: National Parks Board
- Status: Open

Upper Peirce Reservoir Park is a 5 hectares park besides Upper Peirce Reservoir. It was opened by the then Prime Minister Lee Kuan Yew on 27 February 1977.
