= Yan Kit Swimming Complex =

Former swimming pool in Singapore

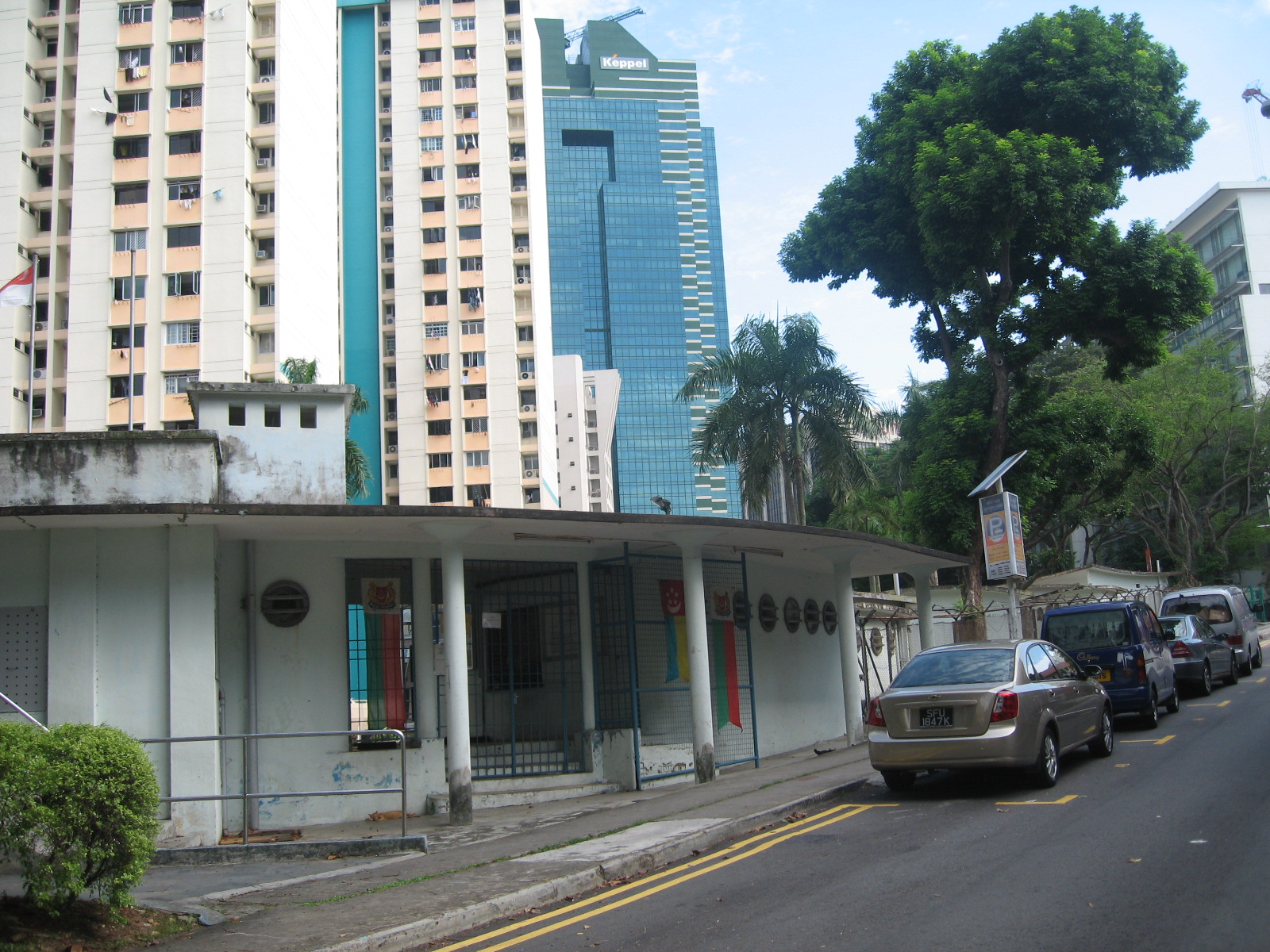
- Yan Kit Swimming Complex in August 2006
- Interactive map of Yan Kit Swimming Complex
- Address: Singapore
- Coordinates: 1°16′35.0″N 103°50′32.1″E

Construction
- Built: December 1949; 76 years ago
- Opened: 29 December 1952; 73 years ago
- Closed: April 2001; 25 years ago
- Cost: $500,000

The Yan Kit Swimming Complex (also called the Yan Kit Swimming pool) was the second public swimming pool in Singapore. Located alongside Yan Kit Road, it opened in 1952 and closed in April 2001. The complex cost a total of $513,000 (as of 1952) and pool users had to pay fifteen cents per entry. The complex closed due to a daily attendance of only 120 users by 2001.

== History ==
Originally constructed as a filter tank for the Water Department, it was closed down during the Japanese occupation and had its plant removed.

Mentions of Yan Kit Swimming Pool first appeared on The Straits Budget in January 1952, where it was reported that the matter of Yan Kit was "still outstanding". It was under construction by September 1952, where it was expected to be opened by November of the same year. Originally expected to cost $400,000, the pool was built by the City Council for $513,000. It was officially opened by then Governor of Singapore John Nicoll and City Council president T. P. F. McNeice on 29 December 1952.

External image
- Opening of Yan Kit Swimming Pool

The pool was temporarily closed on 22 June 1953 due to a damaged underground concrete channel. On 17 June 1954, it was announced by the City Architect of Singapore that from July, an experiment would be conducted at Yan Kit to determine if the pool could operate until 9 pm, as well as if mixed bathing should take place. In 1994, the National Trades Union Congress Club announced plans to lease the pool and redevelop it part of its new clubhouse for S$6 million, but it never materialised.

In April 2001, the Singapore Sports Council (SSC) decided to close the pool and return it to the state as attendance had dwindled to an average of 120 daily, and it was becoming too expensive to maintain. The foundation of the pools had deteriorated, making spot repairs ineffective. SSC estimated that it would cost S$400,000 to maintain and operate the complex annually and S$4 million to upgrade the entire complex. The complex was partially demolished beginning from December 2011, and the site was returned to the Singapore Land Authority in April 2012.

On 18 January 2025, the remains of the complex were reopened as the Yan Kit Pool Heritage Gallery and Mural.

== Details ==
The complex, which occupies a 14,859-sq-m plot of land was built on an old railway site off Cantonment Road and contains three pools, a single-storey clubhouse and three other buildings which house toilets and showers. The pools were lined up in a row with diving platforms at one end and a lifeguard watchtower cum slide between two of the pools. It was named after a Canton-born dentist Look Yan Kit who came to Singapore in 1877 and was involved in the founding of the Kwong Wai Shiu Free Hospital in 1910.

When it first opened, pool users had to pay 15 cents per entry. According to a former pool supervisor, the complex was so popular that there was only standing room and a two-hour limit was imposed on swimmers. On Tuesdays, the pool was opened only to women and girls who were too shy to appear in their bathing suits in front of men. The pools first supervisor was Lee Hong Ming, who was a founding member of the Singapore Life Guard Corps and had served as pool supervisor at the Mount Emily Swimming Complex.

Before Yan Kit Swimming Complex, Singapore only had one other public swimming facility at the Mount Emily Swimming Complex that was built in the 1930s, which has also since been demolished.

== See also ==
- Singapore Sports Council
- Toa Payoh
