= Keppel Hill Reservoir =

Defunct reservoir in Singapore

- Keppel Harbour Power Station Reservoir
- Location within Singapore
- Location: Singapore
- Coordinates: 1°16′14.3″N 103°49′02″E
- Type: private
- Built: April 1899/1905
- Surface area: about 6,727 square feet (625.0 m^{2})
- Average depth: 2 metres (6.6 ft)

The Keppel Hill Reservoir is an abandoned reservoir near Mount Faber in the southern part of Singapore. It was built during the colonial period of Singapore. It fell into disuse due to its small capacity and was eventually forgotten.

== History ==
It is not known when the reservoir was first built. However, there was a mention of an excavation site for a reservoir in the news during those times with the trial of "Westphalite" (explosives) supplied by Paterson, Simons & Co.. The first charge was conducted on 12 April 1899 at the excavation site meant for the reservoir near the foot of Mount Faber and the premises of the New Harbour Company, a company which was later renamed as Keppel Harbour Company on 19 April 1900.

The private reservoir, which is about one-third the size of the modern Olympic-sized swimming pool and which became first known in 1905 as the Keppel Harbour Power Station Reservoir, served the nearby Tanjong Pagar Dock for the Tanjong Pagar Dock Company.

In 1906, the reservoir had its supply channeled to the nearby Pasir Panjang's Government Beri-beri Hospital (1907-1925). It also supported a nearby village. On 14 October 1909, the reservoir was identified as one of the breeding grounds of malaria fever at that time.

Based on a 1924 map from the former Singapore Harbour Board, this reservoir was the largest of three small reservoirs located at the foot of the Mount Faber.

Due to its small capacity, it eventually fell out of use as a reservoir; however residents had taken to swimming in it.

During the Japanese occupation of Singapore from 1942 to 1945, the reservoir was used as a swimming pool by Japanese officers.

By 1954, the outline of its location was no longer listed as a reservoir or a swimming pool in survey maps and the reservoir remained forgotten by the public for the next few decades. Its outline was unlisted from future survey maps by 2000.

In 2005, the Asia Paranormal Investigators team led by Charles Goh came across an abandoned reservoir while they were searching for the lost tomb of a Japanese naval engineer at the foot of Mount Faber. Goh first believed that it was an abandoned swimming pool due to the remnants of a diving board and bathing area at that time. The site was not fenced and there was an old sign hanging from a tree that cautioned visitors not to swim or fish in the reservoir.

On 17 September 2014, a five-member research team from National Heritage Board headed by its assistant director of research, Dr John Kwok, re-discovered its location. Alvin Tan, the group director of policy, said the discovery is historically significant because of the building materials and methods used to build the reservoir, with some being handmade and dating back to the colonial period.

== Incidents ==
On the evening of 6 April 1936, two soldiers from the Middlesex Regiment, Privates Alfred Birch (aged 21) and Francis Hubbard (aged 20), drowned. Hubbard tried to rescue Birch but they had struggled at the reservoir. Thirty other Regiment soldiers, who were about fifty yards from their location, swam quickly towards them, but by the time they reached the duo's last known location, the two had already sunk to the bottom. A local Malay diver, Bujang, of the Singapore Harbour Board arrived half an hour later and dived into the reservoir. Hubbard's body was recovered by the diver about 35 minutes later and Birch's body was discovered by two privates about 10 mins later. Both bodies were brought to the surface by the diver.

The two were unable to be revived at the hospital, and were later buried at Bidadari Cemetery at 5 pm the following day. On 8 April, the soldiers of Middlesex Regiment were instructed not to swim there again. The inquest was held on 16 April 1936, and the incident was ruled as a misadventure.

During the afternoon of 26 March 1948, Chew Teik Pin (aged 17), then an employee of Tyersall Officers' Mess, went with two other youths to the defunct reservoir, then known as Keppel Hill Reservoir. He faced difficulty after his first plunge and disappeared into the depths. His body was recovered the next day. An inquiry into the drowning was held on 3 April 1948 and it was ruled as a misadventure.

== Nearby historical structures ==
- Tomb of the Japanese civilian naval engineer Ekasa Komoto (小本 江笠, Komoto Ekasa)
- No. 11 Keppel Hill House, restricted to public
- Seah Im Bunker
