= James MacRitchie =

Singaporean engineer

James MacRitchie (26 September 1847 – 26 April 1895) was Municipal Engineer to the Singapore Municipal Commission from 1883 to 1895. Singapore's oldest reservoir MacRitchie Reservoir was named after him in 1922.

== Early life and education ==
MacRitchie was born in Southampton on 26 September 1847, the son of the P&O superintendent engineer. He also studied in the Dollar Academy, formerly the Dollar Institution, Scotland and at the Universities of Glasgow and Edinburgh.

== Engineering career ==
MacRitchie worked as a civil engineer on bridges and docks in Scotland, including the Albert Bridge, Glasgow where he gained experience on the use of concrete foundations encased in iron caissons.

MacRitchie went to Calcutta in 1867 to work as an assistant engineer on the Calcutta water project, possibly the Palta Water Works which was built between 1865 and 1868 and is reported to be 'the first modern waterworks in Asia'. Since renamed the Indira Gandhi Water Treatment Works, it had a capacity of 6 million gallons per day in 1865 but has since been expanded significantly.

Upon completion of the Calcutta water project, MacRitchie spent seven years working for the Japan government as Lighthouse Engineer. According to his obituary, published in Singapore, he was responsible for designing and building lighthouses around the coast of Japan and is said to have been the last foreigner to have held this position. MacRitchie worked as an assistant to Richard Henry Brunton the so-called 'father of Japanese lighthouses'.

After Japan, he moved to Brazil where he worked on water works, gas works and tramways before arriving in Singapore in 1883.

MacRitchie took over as Municipal Engineer from Thomas Cargill in 1883. His report to the Municipal Commission in 1884 demonstrates the wide range of duties he had to undertake in Singapore as well as his diligence. He was responsible for numerous works and immense improvements in the streets, bridges, public markets, abattoirs and other infrastructure in Singapore.

MacRitiche was the architect for the new cast-iron octagonal-shaped Lau Pa Sat market (now a national monument) which was relocated to its present position in 1894. MacRitchie followed the original style of George Drumgoole Coleman's 1838 market.

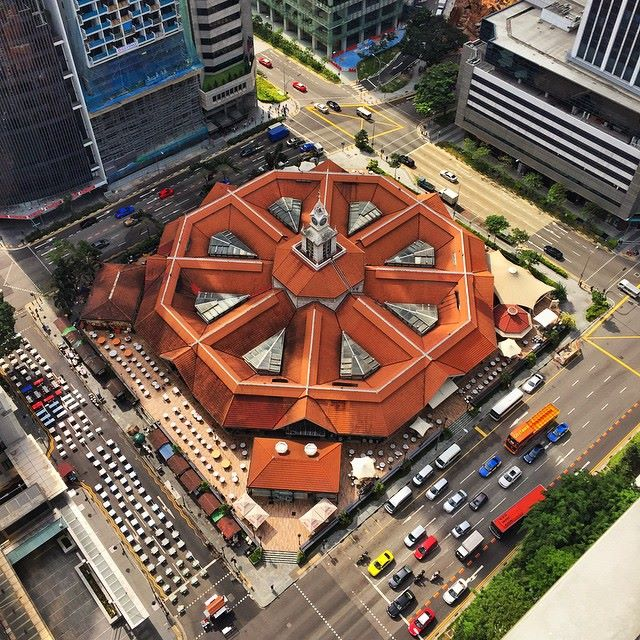
Lau Pa Sat from above

His first major Singapore project was the Coleman Street Bridge which replaced a wooden bridge; over the 12 years of his career as Municipal Engineer he caused 'innumerable' bridges in Singapore to be replaced with iron bridges he designed. His design of small iron bridges first used in Singapore was soon being used throughout Malaya.

MacRitchie applied himself to the problem of night soil and studied various alternatives for Singapore including a pneumatic system and conversion to 'poudrette'. The Municipal Commission sent him on a 3-month fact finding trip to India in 1893 to inspect sanitation, night soil and water supply systems and to bring best practices back to Singapore. The report he prepared had 'all the data and, in many cases, the worked out detail for dealing with the sewage and refuse of Singapore' and was described as 'a valuable contribution to municipal engineering in the East'.

Water supply was a priority for MacRitchie. He replaced water mains and introduced a water filtration plant after which the water supply was said to be second to none in the region. He drew on best practice from England and experimented with a new 'Polarite' filtration material for Singapore. His experience was called upon in Penang where he was asked to advise the Municipal Commission on a new reservoir in 1890.

MacRitchie was best remembered for the Thomson Road or the Impounding Reservoir which is known today as the MacRitchie Reservoir. Construction proved a challenge and was delayed when the works were flooded four times during the 1891-94 construction period. When completed, the reservoir, one and a half miles in length and five and a half miles in circumference, provided the city with 650 million gallons of storage. MacRitchie calculated that this gave Singapore 130 days storage and supply based on daily consumption of 3.2 million gallons of water per day in 1895. MacRitchie noted that the demand for water had more than doubled from 1.4 million gallons per day in 1885 which explains the enormous value and importance of the Impounding Reservoir.

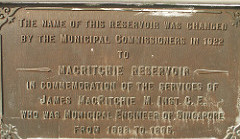
Plaque of MacRitchie Reservoir

MacRitchie became embroiled in a public debate about the use of electricity for public lighting in Singapore with the Colonial Engineer, Major Henry McCallum, who was in favour of electric light. MacRitchie held that 'the extra light [from the electric lamps] was uncalled for' and the Municipality could not afford the cost of electric light. One commentator at the time was concerned that Singapore might fall behind other 'Eastern Towns', including Rangoon, which had introduced electricity.

Although MacRitchie was an expert in water works, he had less experience with electricity. Many of the assumptions in his 1892 report on the use of electric light, as an alternative to gas, were subject to extensively-reported criticism by the electrical engineer O. V. Thomas. Another commentator defended MacRitchie as 'a competent civil engineer, an excellent judge of costs and estimates and [knowledgeable about] the difficulties of labour in the East'

== Personal life ==
MacRitchie married Cameron, daughter of the editor of The Straits Times, in 1883.

== Death and legacy ==
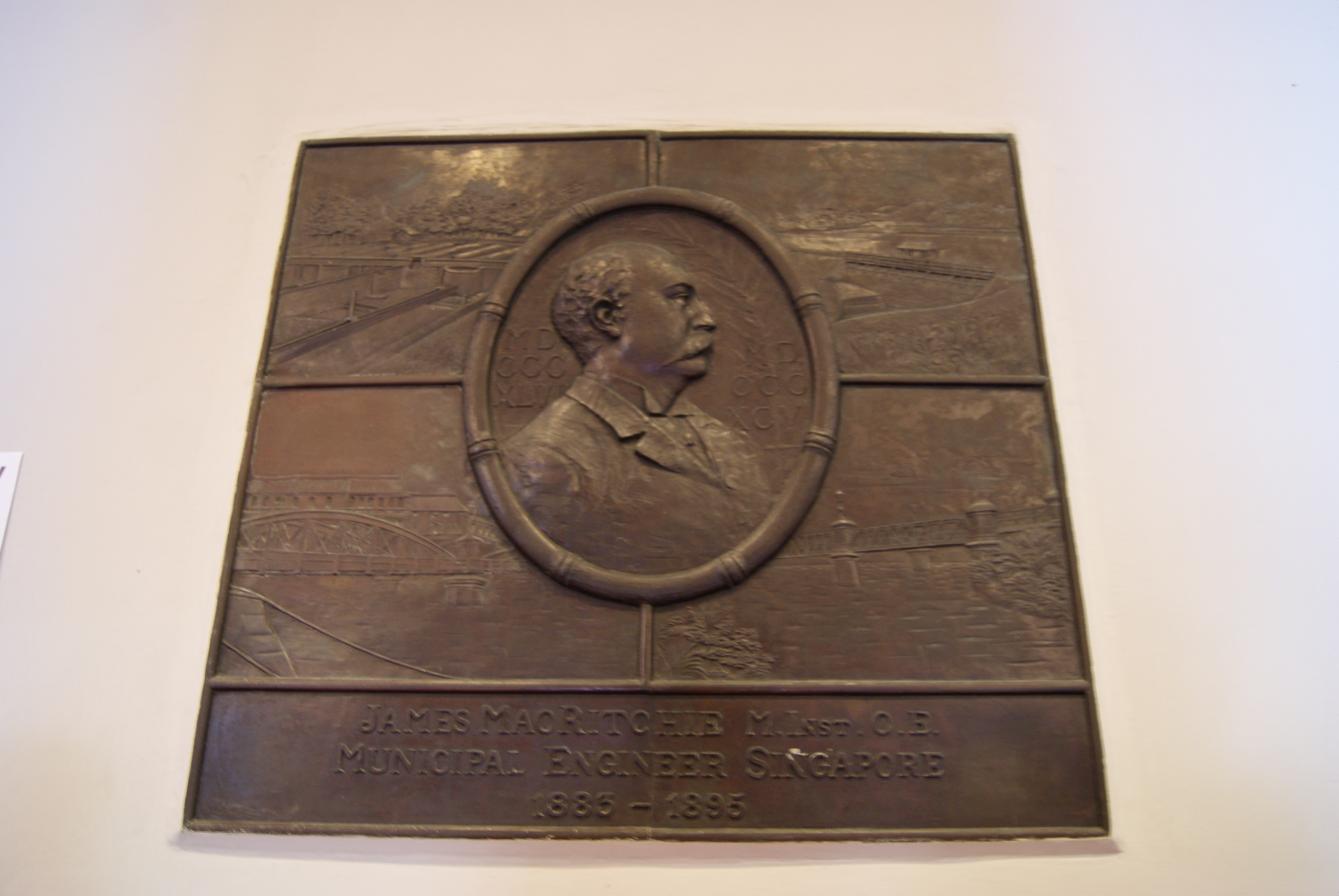
Bronze memorial panel of James MacRitchie

MacRitchie died 26 April 1895, aged 47, at his home 'Woodside', Grange Road, Singapore.

The esteem in which MacRitchie was held, and the shock of his untimely death, resulted in a memorial panel being commissioned in 1896 to be installed in the Town Hall (part of the modern day Victoria Concert Hall). It measured some 8 feet by 9 feet and had a bronze image of Macritchie in the middle with four of his major works in each corner: the Bukit Timah Filters and the Impounding Reservoir representing the waterworks achievements and the Read Bridge and Kim Seng Bridge representing his bridge building
