= Look Yan Kit =

Cantonese dentist (1849–1933)

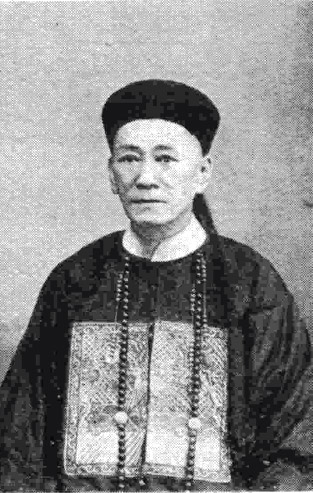
- Born: 1849; Canton, Qing empire
- Died: 1933 (aged 83–84)
- Occupation: Dentist

Look Yan Kit (Chinese: 陆寅杰; 1849 — 1933) was a Cantonese dentist who came to Singapore in 1877 and found great success, having several high-profile clientele. He was a millionaire.

== Early life ==
Look was born in Guangzhou in 1849 and studied dentistry in Hong Kong.

== Career ==
Look came to Singapore in 1877, where he opened a dental clinic. He was very successful, and attracted several high-profile clientele, such as Abu Bakar of Johor and the Rajah of Solo. Due to the success of the clinic, he became a millionaire.

He owned 70 houses and two plantations. He was a founder of the Kwong Wai Shiu Hospital, and served on the hospital's management committee.

== Personal life and death ==
Look had four sons. He died in 1933.

== Legacy ==
Yan Kit Road and the Yan Kit Swimming Complex were named after him.
