= Mount Emily Park =

Park in Singapore

- Interactive map of Mount Emily Park
- Location: Singapore
- Coordinates: 1°18′15″N 103°50′50″E
- Area: 3.1 hectares (7.7 acres)
- Manager: National Parks Board
- Status: Open

Mount Emily Park covers 3.1 hectares in Singapore.

The park is located in District 9, next to Istana and close to the areas known as Little India and Bugis. It contains a stand of mature trees, which serve to moderate the climate in nearby areas.

== See also ==
- Mount Emily Reservoir
- Mount Emily Swimming Pool
