= Pulau Tekong Reservoir =

- Location within Singapore
- Location: Pulau Tekong
- Coordinates: 1°24′48″N 104°02′32″E
- Type: reservoir
- Basin countries: Singapore

Pulau Tekong Reservoir (Chinese: 德光岛蓄水池; pinyin: Déguāngdǎo Xùshuǐchí; Malay: Takungan Air Pulau Tekong) is a reservoir located on the north west of Pulau Tekong, an island in Singapore. It is part of the North-Eastern Islands planning area.

The reservoir currently provides potable water supply for all military installations within the island. Access to the island and hence the reservoir is restricted.

== History ==
Pulau Tekong Reservoir first began construction in 1977 by damming Sungei Seminei, which is located just east of Ladang Camp. In September 1979 the reservoir together with its waterworks was opened and residents on the island finally had access to piped potable water. The reservoir, treatment plant and its accompanying infrastructure of pipes island wide costed $7.3 million. The reservoir allowed residents to be relatively unaffected by the drought of 1981 while villagers in the neighbouring Pulau Ubin had to go through great lengths to receive adequate water supply after their wells went dry. After many were relocated in the early 1980s due to government redevelopment plans, the reservoir continued to serve the island when military facilities were built there.
