= MacRitchie Reservoir =

Reservoir in Singapore

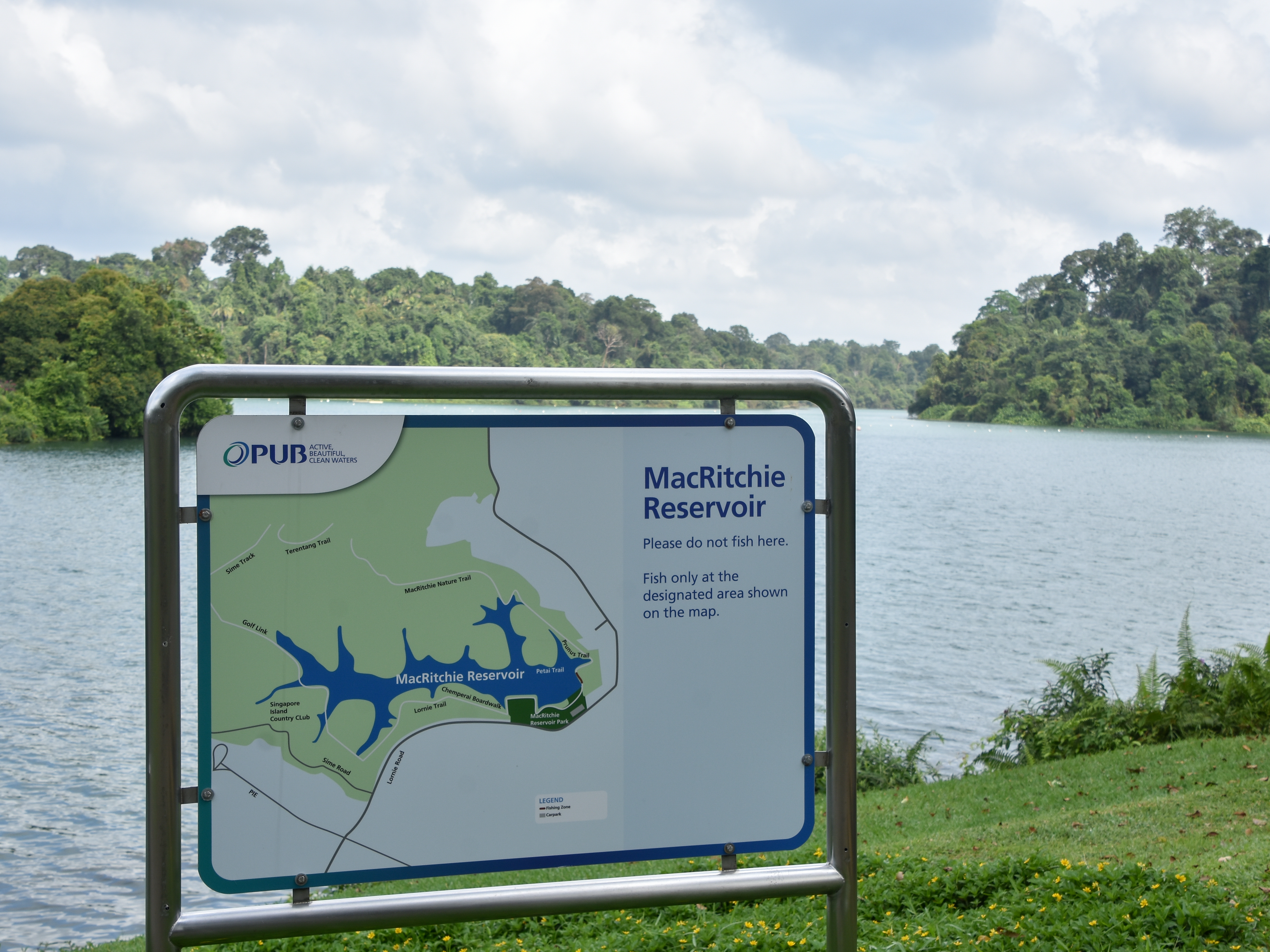
- MacRitchie Reservoir with a map

- Location within Singapore
- Coordinates: 1°20′37″N 103°49′52″E
- Lake type: Reservoir

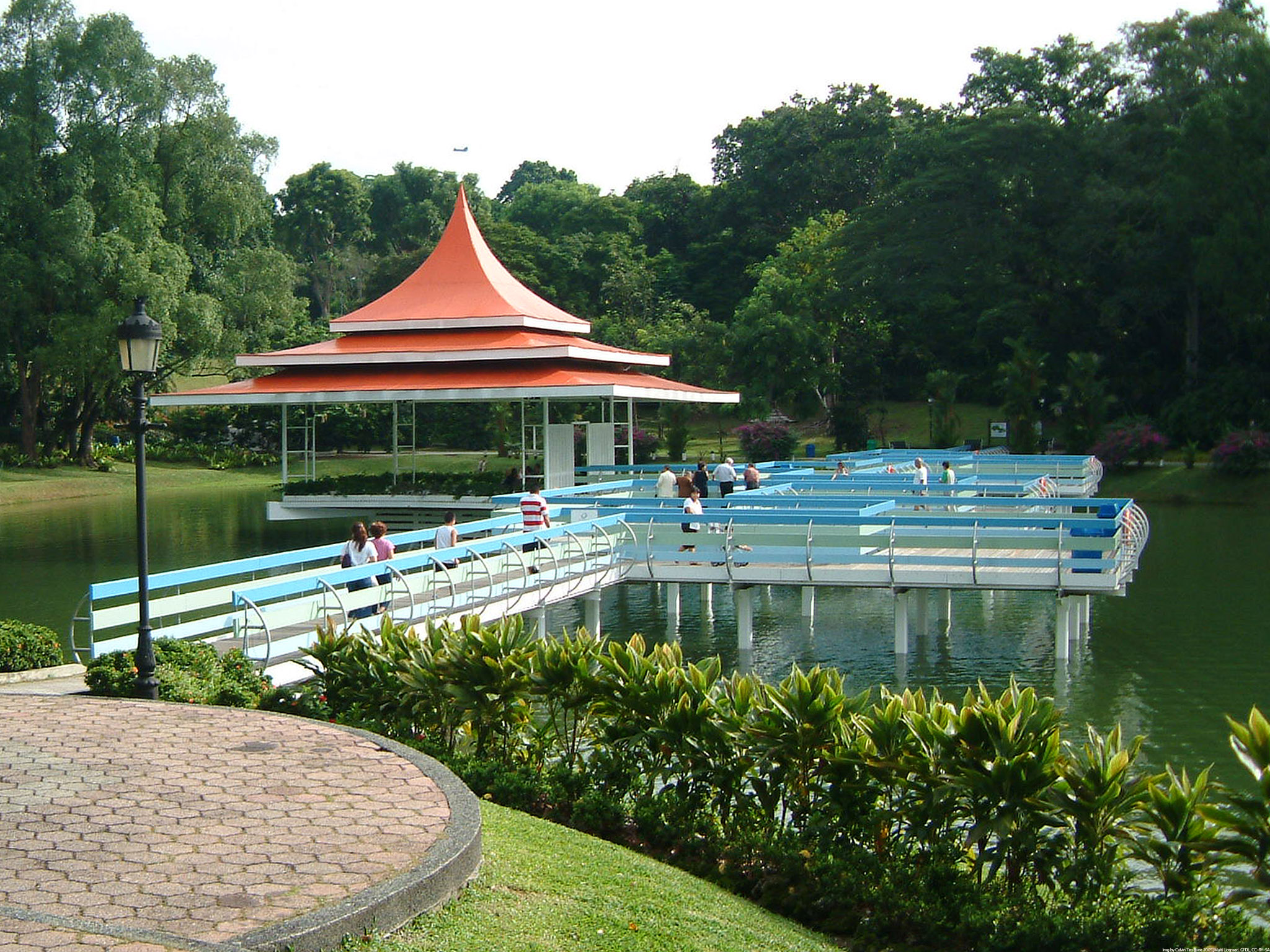
The distinctive zig-zag bridge and Performing Arts Pavilion are popular spots at the reservoir

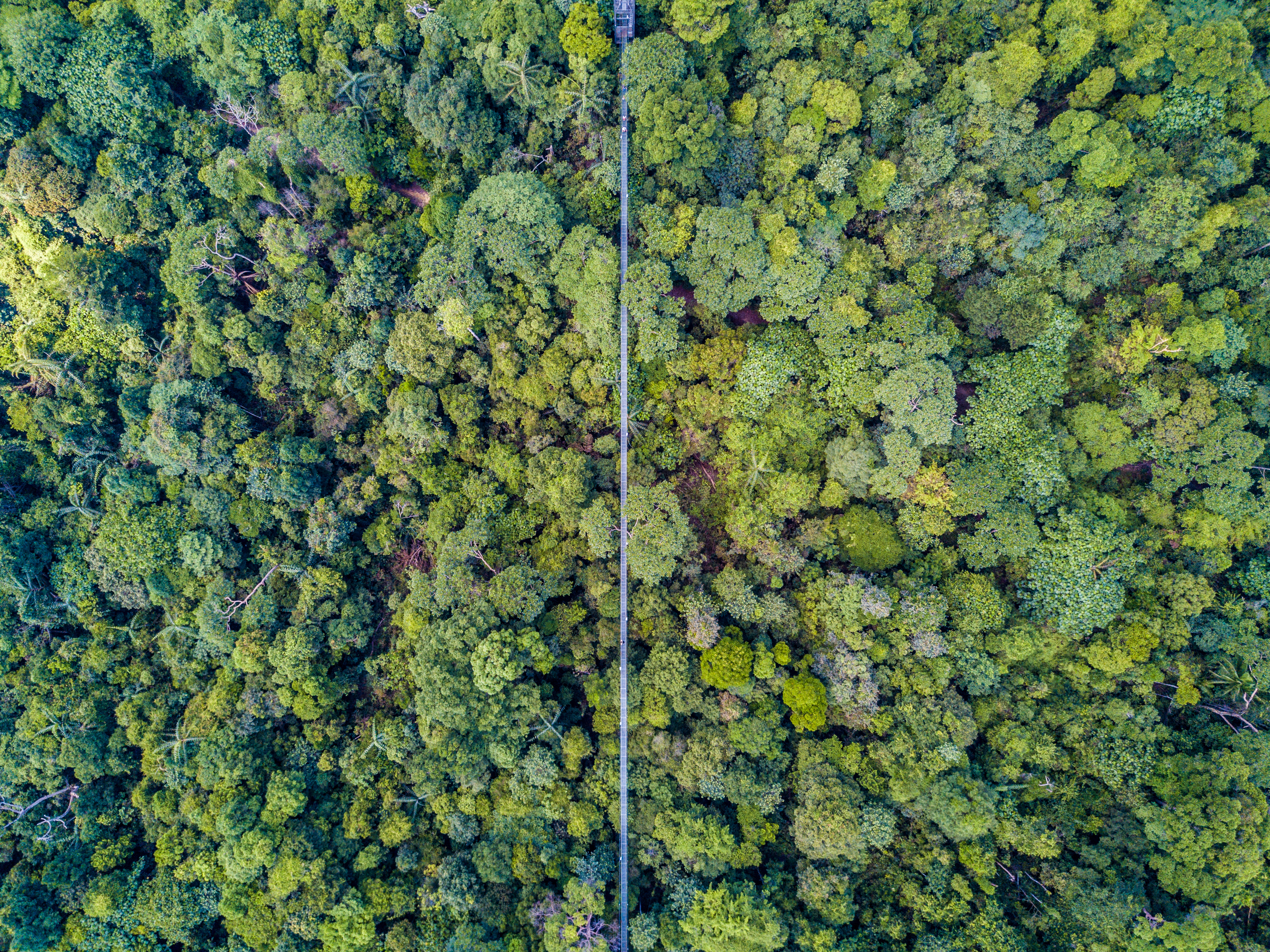
MacRitchie Reservoir Suspension Bridge

MacRitchie Reservoir is Singapore's oldest reservoir and was the first water supply system implemented in Singapore. The reservoir was mostly completed in 1867 by impounding water with an earth embankment, and was then known as the Impounding Reservoir. It was later renamed Thomson Road Reservoir in 1907 before finally named MacRitchie Reservoir after James MacRitchie in 1922.

== History ==
=== Background ===
After a trading post was established by the British in Singapore in 1819, the number of trading vessels and migrants arriving at Singapore grew rapidly. Singapore was dependent on existing wells to supply fresh water and it became inadequate due to increased demand by the new arrivals.

By 1823, to cope with the increased demand of fresh water, British Resident John Crawfurd proposed to build a reservoir and waterworks. In 1852, government surveyor John Turnbull Thomson proposed plans to increase fresh water supplies such as damming the “Singapore Creek”, or building reservoirs to collect the water flowing down from Pearl's Hill and Government Hill.

In 1856 the Municipal Committee granted $500 to Ronald MacPherson, Superintendent of Convicts and Roads, to build a water tank or reservoir at the foot of Government Hill to be used during periods of drought.

In 1857, prominent Straits-born Chinese merchant, philanthropist and municipal commissioner, Tan Kim Seng, donated $13,000 to improve the town’s water supply. In 1881, the municipality erected the Tan Kim Seng Fountain to commemorate his donation for Singapore's first reservoir and waterworks.

=== Construction ===
Plans for a reservoir were only submitted in January 1863, six years after Tan's donation, but were not approved by the government. After a severe drought where most wells in Singapore had dried up, the government was urged by the Governor of Singapore, John Crawfurd, in 1865 to approve the plans.

The reservoir finished most construction in 1867. It was initially named Impounding Reservoir, before it was renamed as Thomson Road Reservoir in 1907. In 1922, the reservoir was renamed MacRitchie Reservoir in honour of James MacRitchie who was the Municipal Engineer to the Singapore Municipal Commission from 1883 to 1895.

=== World War II ===
During the Japanese occupation of Singapore in World War II, after the Japanese troops seized Bukit Timah from the British, the reservoir was captured intact. The Japanese did not cut off the water supply from the reservoir, although slight damage to the reservoir's facilities like the pumping-stations meant much water was lost instead of being channelled to the city, by then crowded with almost one million British-commanded troops and refugees, which was badly in need for a steady water source.

== Present ==
More than one square kilometre of primary forest is still standing in Central Catchment Nature Reserve today, particularly around MacRitchie Reservoir. Forest trees, remnants of the plantations from the 20th century, can still be seen along the fringes of MacRitchie Reservoir.

There are boardwalks skirting the edge of the scenic MacRitchie Reservoir and trails through the forest. They range in distances from 3 km to 11 km. Interpretative signboards along the boardwalks allow for a self-guided tour along the fringes of the MacRitchie forest.

The boardwalk around the perimeter of the MacRitchie Reservoir brings the visitor through interesting secondary forest in the Central Catchment Nature Reserve area. The boardwalk which hugs the reservoir also allows for easy exploration of freshwater wildlife. The ant plant (Macaranga bancana.) and pitcher plants are common in the area.

In addition to the boardwalk, another popular attraction is the HSBC TreeTop Walk, a 250 m aerial free-standing suspension bridge spanning Bukit Peirce and Bukit Kalang which are the two highest points in MacRitchie. The bridge was completed in July 2004, and the TreeTop Walk was officially launched on 5 November 2004. The structure, which is 25 m at its highest point, offers visitors a panoramic view of Upper Pierce Reservoir and the surrounding lush rainforest. Jelutong Tower also offers a view of the Singapore Island Country Club golf course and the MacRitchie Reservoir.

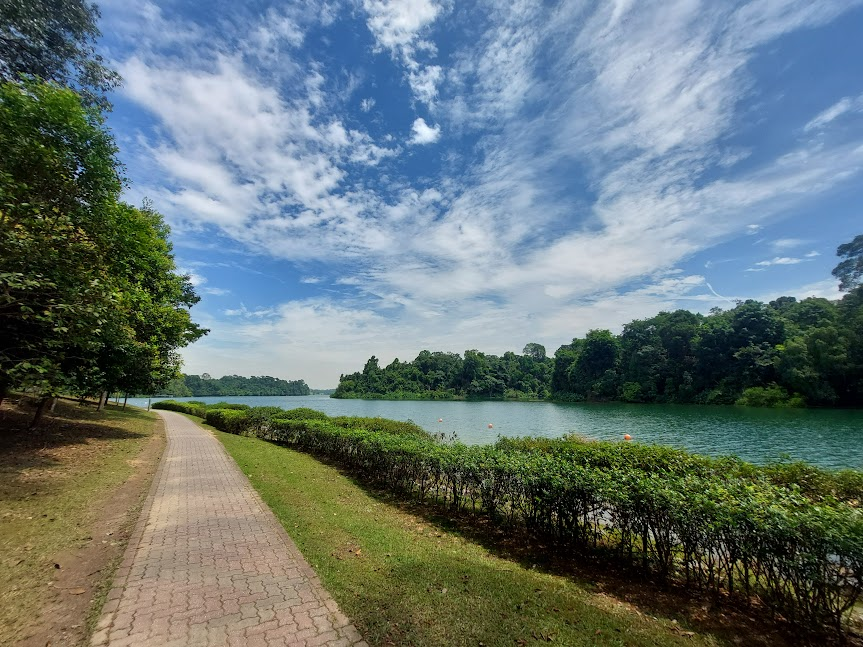
Macritchie Reservoir in the afternoon from Lornie Trail

The 3.2 km and 4.8 km trails are still used as cross-country running routes for various inter-school competitions today.

Schools can be seen using the reservoir as a place for water sports such as canoeing and kayaking. There are certain competitions held there annually.

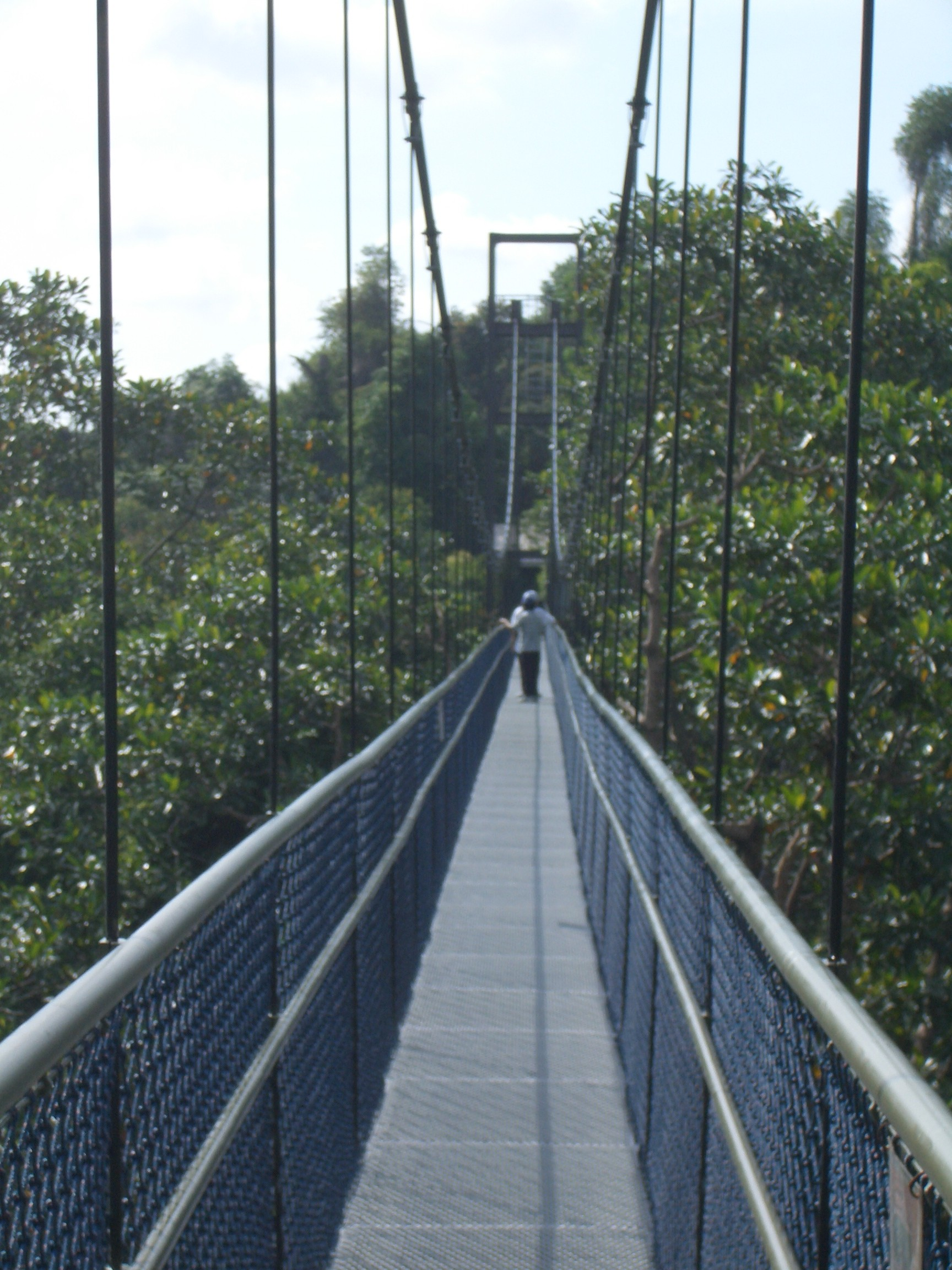
The suspension bridge as part of the treetop walk

== See also ==
- Central Catchment Nature Reserve
- Syonan Jinja
