= Lower Peirce Reservoir =

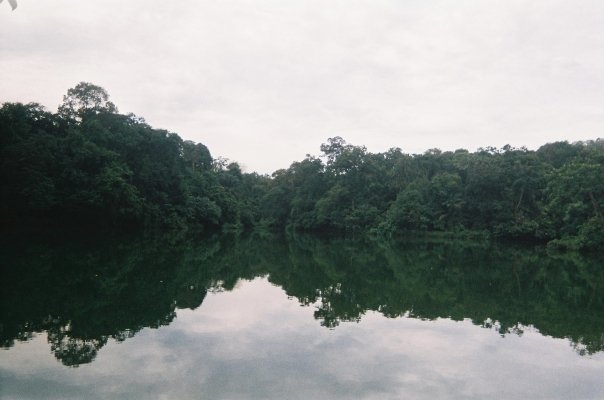
- View from waterside boardwalk

- Location within Singapore
- Coordinates: 1°22′10″N 103°49′24″E
- Type: reservoir
- Primary outflows: Kallang River
- Basin countries: Singapore
- Surface area: 59 ha (150 acres)

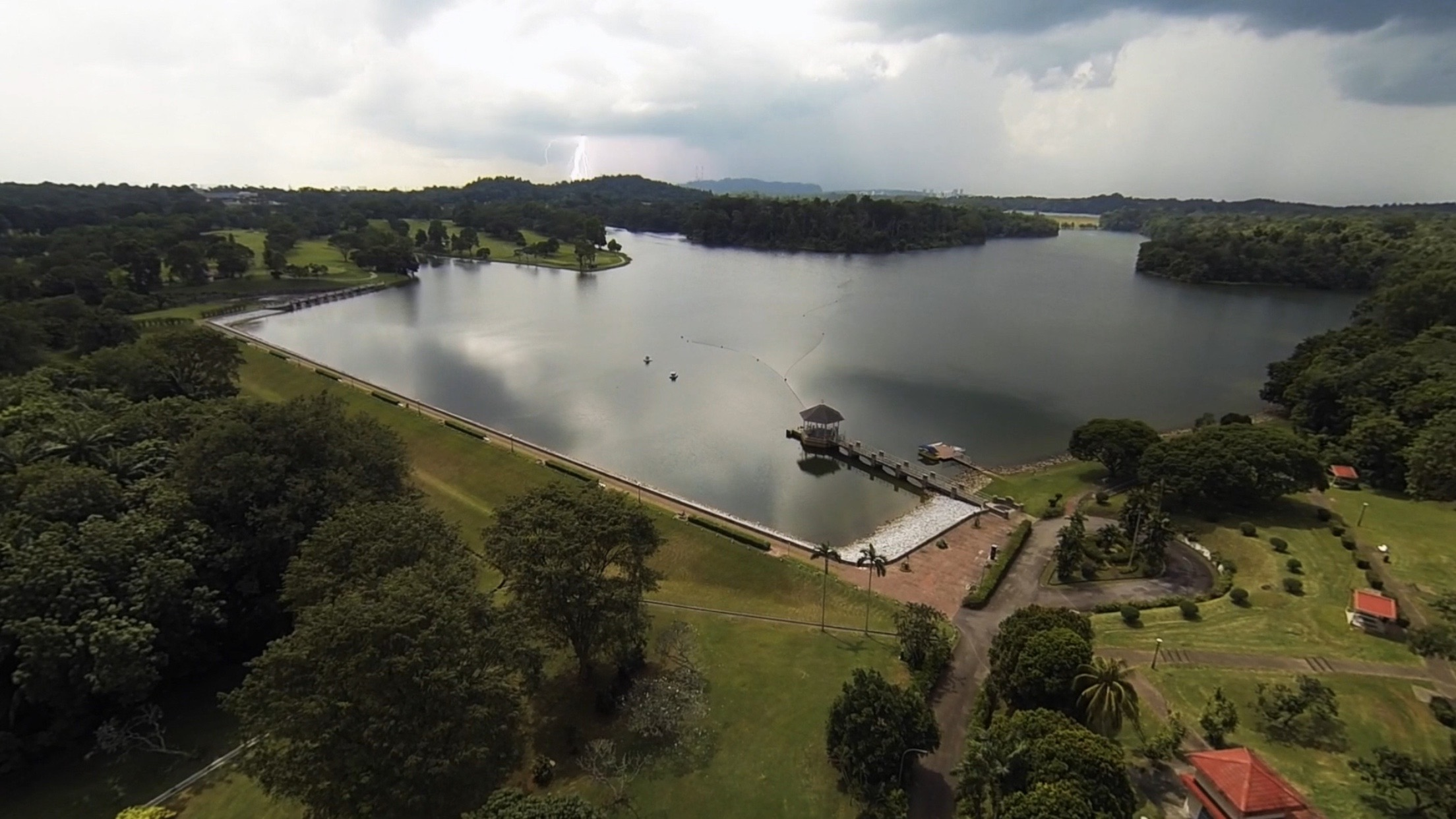
Aerial perspective of Lower Peirce Reservoir, shot from east.

The Lower Peirce Reservoir (Chinese: 贝雅士蓄水池下段 Malay: Takungan Air Lower Peirce) is one of the oldest reservoirs in Singapore. It is located near MacRitchie Reservoir and Upper Peirce Reservoir. Previously known as Kallang River Reservoir or Peirce Reservoir, it was renamed Lower Peirce Reservoir after the creation of Upper Peirce Reservoir. It has a surface area of 59 hectares and the surrounding forest contains many trees that are over 100 years old.

There is a Lower Peirce Trail, which is a 900-metre boardwalk that takes visitors through a mature secondary forest. The reservoir is the source of the Kallang River, the longest river in Singapore. There is also a park, Lower Peirce Reservoir Park, which overlooks the reservoir.

== History ==
Originally known as the Kallang River Reservoir, Singapore's second reservoir was impounded across the lower reaches of the Kallang River in 1910. In 1922, it was renamed Peirce Reservoir in commendation of the services of Robert Peirce, who was the municipal engineer of Singapore from 1901 to 1916.

In 1975, a major water supply project to develop new water resources was undertaken to support Singapore's rapid housing and industrialisation programmes. A dam was constructed at the upper reaches of the Peirce Reservoir, forming the Upper and Lower Peirce Reservoirs.

Upper Peirce Reservoir was officially opened by Prime Minister Lee Kuan Yew on 27 February 1977.

In 1923, the Municipal Engineer Col Pearson made allegations about defective work on the 'Kallang Reservoir Dam'. He went so far as to raise the question as to whether the Municipal engineering staff (Peirce and his deputy Williams) may have colluded with the contractor to use sub-standard clay which resulted in leakage in the dam. There was extensive newspaper coverage over 3 days in April 1923 and discussion in the Municipal Commission. From his retirement, Peirce wrote a lengthy letter to defend the work.

== Pillar 7/BASE7 ==
Under the Boundaries and Survey Maps (Conduct of Cadastral Surveys) Rules, the Lower Peirce Reservoir is also home of the reference point used for Singapore's geodetic co-ordinate datum or SVY21. The location is at latitude 1°22’02.915414" N, longitude 103° 49’31.975227" E and is marked by a green pillar. Under Singapore Land Authority's Guidelines and Specifications for GPS Surveys of ISN Markers, surveyors in Singapore are required to conduct a gross error test of their GPS equipment at this reference point.
