= Upper Peirce Reservoir =

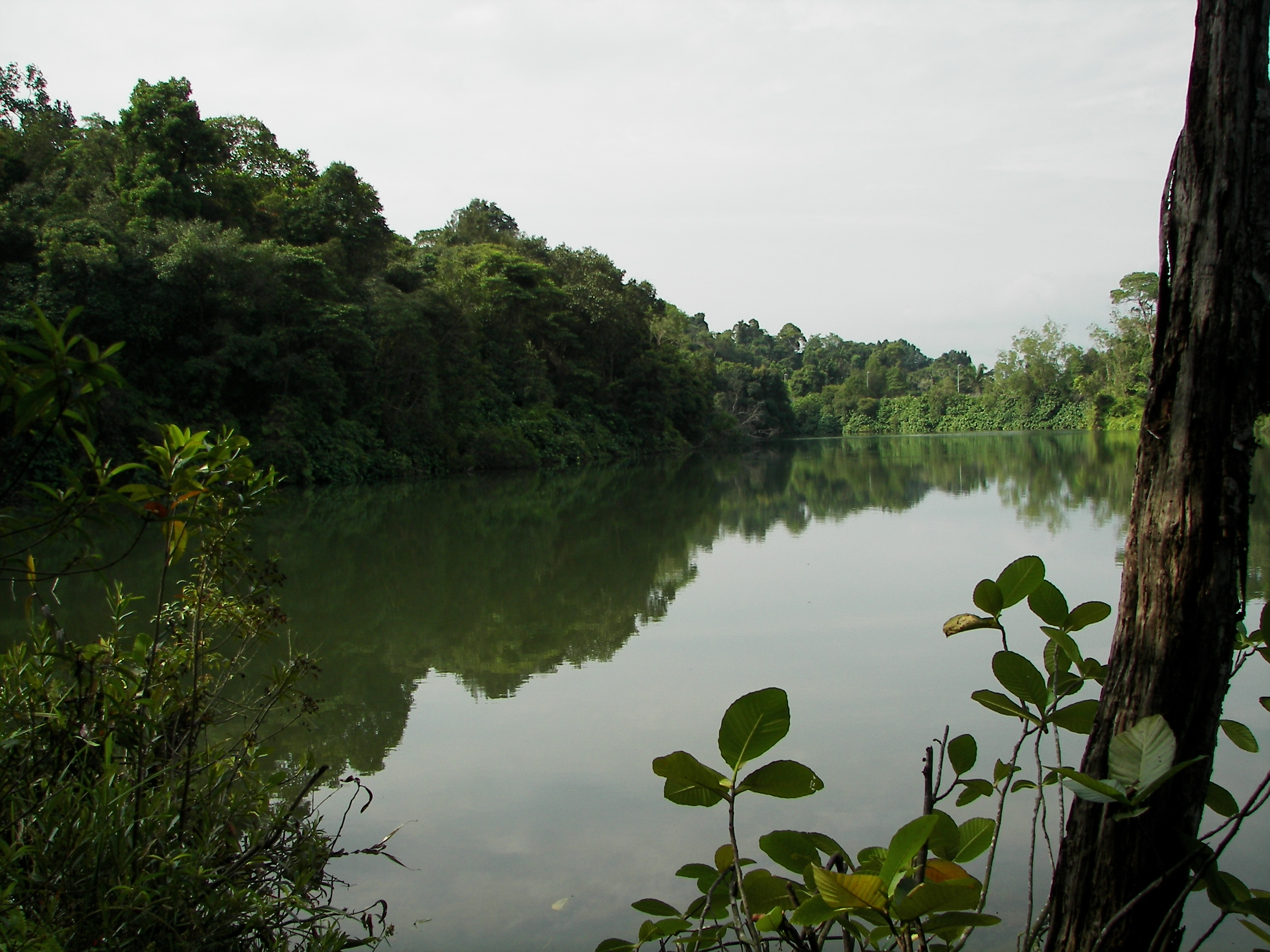

- Location within Singapore
- Coordinates: 1°22′03″N 103°48′07″E
- Type: reservoir
- Primary inflows: Kallang River
- Primary outflows: Kallang River
- Basin countries: Singapore
- Surface area: 304 ha (750 acres)

Upper Peirce Reservoir (Chinese: 贝雅士蓄水池上段) is Singapore's fourth reservoir. The 5-hectare Upper Peirce Reservoir Park overlooks the Upper Peirce Reservoir.

== History ==
Originally known as the Kallang River Reservoir, Singapore's second reservoir was impounded across the lower reaches of the Kalang River in 1910. In 1922, it was renamed Peirce Reservoir in commendation of the services of Robert Peirce, who was the municipal engineer of Singapore from 1901 to 1916.

In late 1960s, due to increasing demand for water and the need to increase the capacity of Peirce Reservoir, a higher dam was constructed upstream of the existing dam at Peirce Reservoir in 1970.

In 1975, a major water supply project to develop new water resources was undertaken to support Singapore's rapid housing and industrialisation programmes. A dam was constructed at the upper reaches of the Peirce Reservoir, forming the Upper and Lower Peirce Reservoirs.

Upper Peirce Reservoir was officially opened by then Prime Minister Lee Kuan Yew on 27 February 1977. The fourth and largest reservoir of Singapore has a capacity of 27.8 million m^{3} of water over 304 hectares of water surface.

== Upper Peirce Reservoir Park ==
Upper Peirce Reservoir Park is a 5 hectares park beside the reservoir. Adding to its local scenery is the surrounding secondary forest which was protected as a water catchment area when the reservoir was built.
