= Driving licence in Singapore =

Singaporean driving licence
- Type: Driving licence
- Issued by: Singapore (Note: Issued by the Singapore Police Force (SPF).)
- Purpose: Authorisation
- Eligibility: Singaporeans, permanent residents and foreigners with a valid visa above 18 who have passed a practical driving test
- Expiration: Lifelong, but medical clearance needed at 65
- Cost: $25 – Provisional driving license only S$50 – Driving licence issue fee only $6.50 – Traffic Police Theory Test(s) $33 – Traffic Police Practical Test; Up to S$4,000 – Total learning cost (Note: Total final costs towards a 3/3A license, which may cost up to S$3,000 to S$4,000. In 2022, a supplementary digital driving license (Digital DL) was made available on the Singpass app.)

A driving licence in Singapore is required before a person is allowed to drive a motor vehicle of any description on a road in the country. An individual must possess a valid driving licence before being permitted to drive on the road, and driving licence holders are subject to all traffic rules. The minimum age to drive a motor vehicle and getting a Qualified Driving Licence (QDL) in Singapore is 18 years old. (Note: For 2B, 3, 3A, 3C and 3CA only.) The driving licence is for the normal lifespan of a person, but continued eligibility to drive requires a medical clearance after reaching the age of 65.

Learners can engage in one of the three operational driving schools or private driving instructors to learn. In an effort to professionalise driver education, no new licences for private driving instructors have been issued since 1987. For those who accumulated 13 demerit points and above within the one-year probationary period, the licence will be revoked. Driving licences in Singapore are administered by the Traffic Police (TP) of the Singapore Police Force (SPF).

== Classes of driving licence ==
The classification of motor vehicles and eligibility of a driving licence in Singapore is as follows:

Class	Type	Minimum age	Notes
1	Invalid Carriages.	18	Only issued to those with physical disabilities, in lieu of other classes of licences
2B	Motor cycles with an engine capacity not exceeding 200cc. Electric motor cycles with a power rating not exceeding 15 kW.	18	
2A	Motor cycles with an engine capacity not exceeding 400cc. Electric motor cycles with a power rating exceeding 15 kW but not exceeding 25 kW.	19	Possession of Class 2B for at least one year, hence the minimum age is 19 years old.
2	Motor cycles with an engine capacity exceeding 400cc. Electric motor cycles with a power rating exceeding 25 kW.	20	Possession of Class 2A for at least one year, hence the minimum age is 20 years old.
3	(a) Motor cars of unladen weight not exceeding 3,000 kg with not more than 7 passengers, exclusive of the driver; and (b) Motor tractors and other motor vehicles of unladen weight not exceeding 2,500 kg	18	Manual and Automatic Transmissions.
3A	(a) Motor cars without clutch pedals of unladen weight not exceeding 3,000 kg with not more than 7 passengers exclusive of the driver; and (b) Motor tractors and other motor vehicles without clutch pedals of unladen weight not exceeding 2,500 kg.	18	Automatic Transmission only.
3C	(a) Motor cars constructed solely and adapted to carry not more than 7 passengers (exclusive of the driver) and the weight of which unladen does not exceed 3,000 kilograms only.	18	Work Permit and S-Pass holders only need to pass the Basic Theory Test to convert their foreign driving licence to be allowed to drive all Class 3 vehicles except for light goods vehicles, mini vans and small buses.
3CA	(a) Motor cars without clutch pedals of unladen weight not exceeding 3,000 kg with not more than 7 passengers exclusive of the driver.	18	The Class 3CA licence is introduced to new drivers who only want to drive automated Class 3C vehicles.
4A	Omnibus	21	Licence Holder must be working for a public bus operator operating under the Bus Contracting Model (BCM) as a Bus Captain. Licence will be revoked once they leave the company.
4	Heavy motor vehicles of unladen weight exceeding 2,500 kg which are constructed to carry load or passengers.	21	Persons must hold a Class 3 Qualified Licence before applying for a Class 4 licence. The minimum age for driving this class of vehicles is 21 years old.
5	Heavy motor vehicles not constructed to carry any load and the unladen weight exceeds 7,250 kg.	21	Persons must hold a Class 4 Qualified Licence before applying for a Class 5 licence. The minimum age for driving this class of vehicles is 21 years old.

== Tests ==
=== History ===
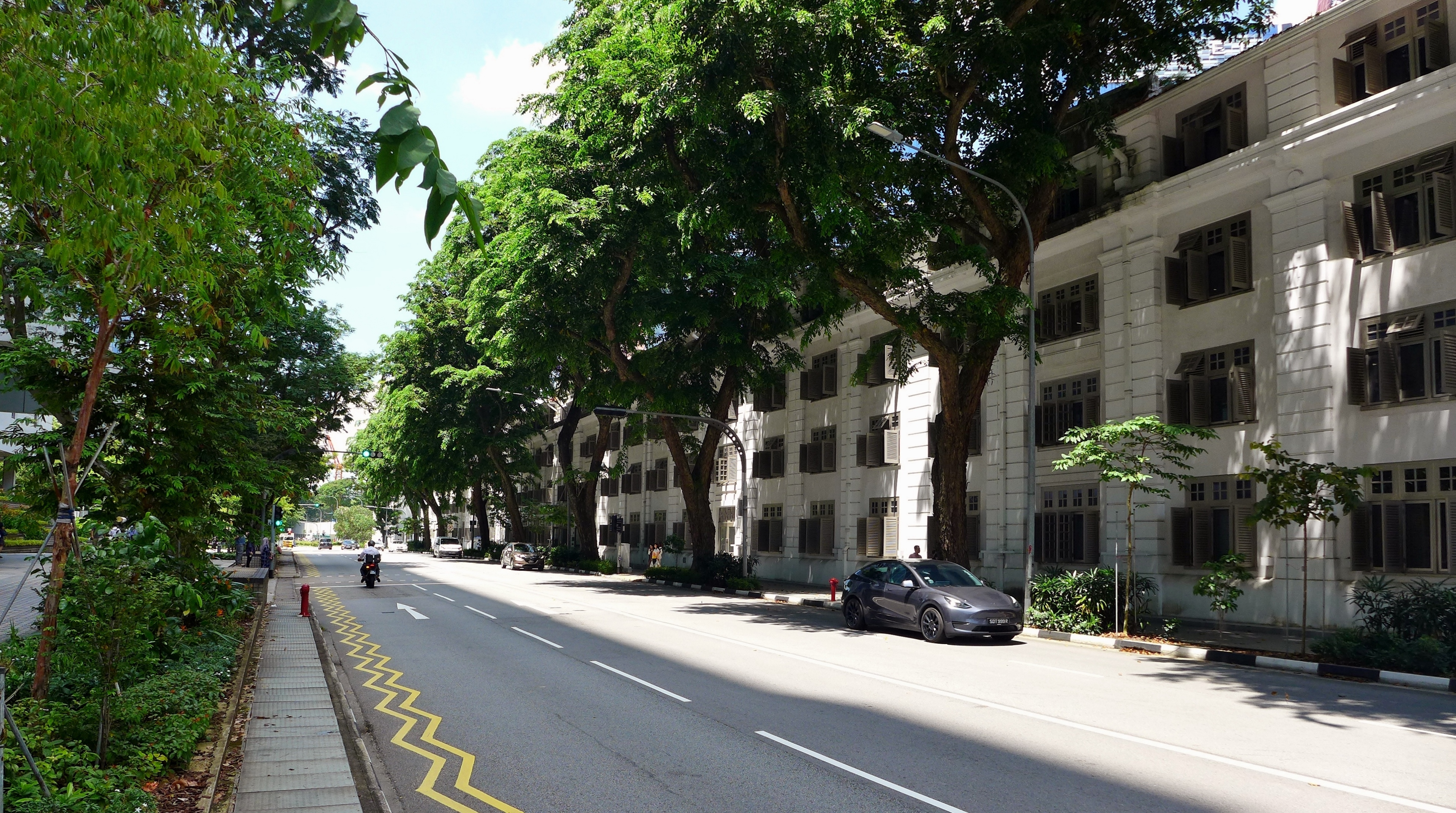
28 Maxwell Road, which housed Singapore's first driving test centre from 1941 and operated until 1978.

Driving tests were first introduced in Singapore in 1941, at 28 Maxwell Road, which was the first driving test centre in Singapore. Managed by the Traffic Police, the testing system was expanded after World War II to accommodate rising vehicle ownership through a decentralised network of regional facilities. In 1968, a second major centre opened at Queenstown, followed by a testing site at Pasir Panjang in the early 1970s. A third major regional centre was established in Jurong in May 1977, located near the Jurong Stadium. These early facilities were rudimentary, often consisting of small administrative offices where candidates met examiners before proceeding onto public roads for their practical tests.

The transition toward a school-based model began in 1985 with the opening of the Singapore Safety Driving Centre (SSDC) in Ang Mo Kio, which was the first to feature a dedicated off-road circuit. To standardise training, the government stopped issuing new licences to private driving instructors in 1987. During this period, another regional centre operated at Toa Payoh, which had opened in 1978. In 1990, the Bukit Batok Driving Centre (BBDC) was commissioned to serve the western region, leading to the closure of the Jurong testing site. The consolidation of the industry was finalised in 1996 when the government-run Kampong Ubi Driving Test Centre, which had served the north-east and eastern region since the 1980s, was privatised to become the ComfortDelGro Driving Centre (CDC).

By the late 1990s, the regional centres at Maxwell Road, Queenstown and Toa Payoh had all ceased testing operations as the three-school model became the national standard. This shift allowed the Traffic Police to focus on examinations and enforcement while private schools managed instruction. Today, the system consists of the SSDC, (Note: Relocated from Ang Mo Kio to Woodlands in 2010 to better serve the northern region.) the BBDC, and the CDC. While some private instructors from the pre-1987 pool continue to operate, they are in decreasing numbers and the majority of candidates now use the integrated school circuits. Further changes are expected by 2030, when BBDC is scheduled to relocate to a new site in Choa Chu Kang to accommodate the development of Tengah.

=== Theory Tests ===
There are three main theory tests in Singapore. Theory tests are three choice multiple theory tests about different aspects of the road as well as the vehicle. Candidates must answer 45 questions correctly out of 50 (90%), and the questions are at random from a pool of hundreds on a selection of relevant topics based on the Basic & Final Driving and Riding Theory handbooks. Each theory test costs $6.50 to take, not including administrative fees set by each driving school. Practice sets for these tests are available on the police website.

- Basic Theory Test (BTT) — Valid for a lifetime unless revoked, suspended or disqualified by TP.
- Final Theory Test (FTT) — Valid for 2 years unless revoked, suspended or disqualified by TP.
- Riding Theory Test (RTT) — Valid for 1 year unless revoked, suspended or disqualified by TP. Motorcycle riding theory, additional requirement for Class 2B only.

=== Practical Tests ===
Unless performing a foreign licence conversion, this test is required for all learners to obtain a QDL. Passing this test entitles the candidate to hold a full driving licence. The driving test consists of two parts, a circuit and on-road section. The circuit contains different courses aimed at assessing driver skills in areas like parking, low speed controls, tight turns and hill starts. The road sections of the test tests the ability on how candidates interact with other road users and comply with traffic rules.

In each driving school circuit, there are the following courses:

- Crank Course — Tests the candidates ability on low speed and steering wheel control through tight spaces. A separate course is used for motorcycles.
- 'S' Course — Tests the candidates ability on low speed control. Additional manoeuvres are penalised during the test. A separate course is used for motorcycles.
- Parallel Parking (Motorcars only) — Tests the candidates ability on how to parallel park. The maximum given time for parallel parking is 3 minutes.
- Vertical Parking (Motorcars only) — Tests the candidates ability on how to vertical park. The maximum given time for vertical parking is 5 minutes.
- Directional Change (Motorcars only)— Tests the candidates ability on how to change their ability to change directions within confined spaces.
- Reaction Test (Automatic transmission motorcars only) — Tests the candidates ability on how to manage accidental forward or backwards surging movement.
- Emergency Stop — Tests the candidates ability on how to stop a vehicle as quickly and safely as possible.
- Pylon Slalom (Motorcycles only) — Tests the candidates skills on how to avoid emergency obstacles and hazards. The maximum time to complete this course is 6 seconds.
- Narrow Plank (Motorcycles only) — Tests the candidates ability on keeping the motorcycle on a straight course at low speeds.

The on-road driving test is conducted on public roads around the driving schools, and learners will travel on routes that test their ability to interact with other road users, comply with traffic rules and perform road manoeuvres like U-Turns, right turns and left turns. In addition, should the examiner need to intervene for safety, this is constituted as a serious mistake and an 'immediate failure', and will constitute as a fail as described below.

Each test is conducted by an examiner appointed by the Traffic Police, who will record each candidates ability on both the circuit section and on-road section. Each mistake is marked and categorised into 'immediate failures' and 'demerit points', with more serious mistakes being the former. Should a candidate obtain one immediate failure or 20 demerit points, this will constitute as a failure on the test. Each test is recorded, and candidates may not enter the on-road section if they fail within the circuit. Candidates must produce their Provisional Driving License (PDL) prior to the test.

== Types of driving licence ==
The "L" learner driver plate in Singapore.

- Provisional driving licence (PDL) — possessed by learners in driving schools or under private instructors. A PDL can only be applied after passing the BTT and paying $25, which can be taken at any of the established driving schools in Singapore. This restricted licence itself carries several restrictions, and failure to adhere to them will lead to an immediate revocation of the PDL.
  - A certified driving instructor must be present to guide the learner driver.
  - A learner driver is not allowed to use expressways/semi-expressways, and are not allowed to enter certain central areas during peak hours. Learner drivers are also not allowed to enter certain recreation car parks and all public car parks.
  - A "L" plate must be visibly placed at the front and rear of the car.
  - A PDL is valid for 2 years from the date of grant and can be renewed subsequently for every 2 years. Prior to 1 December 2017, a PDL was valid for 6 months and renewable every 6 months.
  - People above the age of 65 will be required to pass a medical examination when they apply for or renew their PDLs.

Only upon the passing of a FTT (as well as RTT for Class 2B), and completing the 3 mandatory simulator courses, then can the learner driver can then proceed to attempt the practical driving test.

- Qualified driving licence (QDL) — full licence. Upon passing the practical driving test, the learner may now apply for a QDL for $50. The licence holder will subsequently undergo a 1-year probation period, in which they are required to display the high-visibility probationary licence plate which is triangular in shape, at the top right portion of the front windscreen and the rear windscreen, as seen from the outside of the vehicle. If the licence holder accumulates more than 12 demerit points within the probationary year, the licence will be revoked. Failure to display the probationary license plates will also cause the offending driver to receive a fine for the first time, then an immediate revocation of their license for the subsequent time.
- Vocational driving licence (VDL) — a special driving licence for drivers of taxis and buses. There are three types of VDL: Bus Driver’s Vocational Licence (BDVL), Private Hire Car Driver's Vocational Licence (PDVL) and Taxi Driver's Vocational Licence (TDVL). To apply for the Bus Driver’s Vocational Licence (BDVL), the applicant must be at least 21 years old at the time of application, have a qualified Class 3 Singapore driving licence with at least one year of driving experience, a clean driving record and a clean criminal record. To apply for either the Taxi Driver's Vocational Licence (TDVL) or the Private Hire Car Driver's Vocational Licence (PDVL), the applicant must be a Singapore citizen who is at least 30 years old at the time of application, have a qualified Class 3 Singapore driving licence with at least one year of driving experience, a clean driving record and a clean criminal record. A fourth type of vocational driving licence, the Omnibus Driver's Vocational Licence (ODVL) allows licence holders to operate SBS, SMB and SG-prefixed omnibuses operated by public bus operators under the Bus Contracting Model (BCM), however, like the Class 4A licence, Omnibus Driver's Vocational Licence (ODVL) holders must be employed by a public bus operator operating under the Bus Contracting Model (BCM) in order to hold the Omnibus Driver's Vocational Licence (ODVL).

== Conversion of overseas driving licence ==
Foreigners holding foreign driving licence and intend to remain in Singapore for less than 12 months and not seeking residency are not required to convert their foreign driving licence to a Singaporean driving licence. They may drive in Singapore with a valid foreign driving licence. However, if the licence is not in English, they are required to have an International Driving Permit (IDP) even if the visit fulfils the above conditions.

Foreigners from all Association of Southeast Asian Nations (ASEAN) member states need to possess a valid driving licence but do not require an IDP to drive in Singapore under the ASEAN Agreement on the Recognition of Domestic Driving Licenses.

To convert to a Singaporean driving licence, the foreigner is required to pass the BTT for familiarisation of traffic rules and Singapore's Highway Code pertaining to traffic related issues specific to Singapore. A Singaporean Permanent Resident (PR) who wishes to drive in Singapore is required to convert their foreign driving licence to a Singaporean one after becoming a PR or they will not be considered licensed to drive.

=== Validity of the Singaporean driving license overseas ===
The Singaporean driving license is valid without the need of an International Driving Permit (IDP) in All ASEAN member states, Australia, Argentina, (Note: Subject to a visit of fewer than 30 days.) Barbados, (Note: An IDP is not needed but required to obtain a Visitor's Permit, also known as a Visitor's Registration Certificate. This permit can be obtained from the Barbados Licensing Authority, the Barbados Revenue Authority or from a car rental company when renting a vehicle. It is usually valid for the duration of the visitor's stay for visa-free nationals or for a specified period like 2 months / 1 year depending on the application made for visa required nationals.) Brazil, (Note: Subject to a visit of fewer than 180 days.) Canada, (Note: Subject to a visit of fewer than 90 days.) Chile, (Note: Subject to a visit of fewer than 30 - 90 days depending on the short-term visa validity given.) Colombia, Cuba, Gibraltar, Hong Kong, Ireland, Israel, (Note: Provided that the date of issue for the driver license is at least 7 years or more.) Macau, New Zealand, Qatar, Russia, South Africa, (Note: Subject to a visit of fewer than 120 days) United Arab Emirates, and United Kingdom.

== Costs ==
In Singapore, it is not unusual to end up cumulatively paying about S$3,000 to S$4,000 towards a Class 3 or 3A driving license, owing to the vast number of courses, tests and simulations required. Such costs may end up being much higher if the practical driving test was not passed on the first try, as the test itself ranges about SGD$320 to SGD$550 (Note: Although the actual test itself costs S$33, this fee rises exponentially due to vehicle rental, insurance, circuit and warm-up fees, among other factors.) or if additional lessons are required to reach driving competency. As of 2024, the first timer passing rate for Class 3 and 3A averages around 37% and 46% respectively. Due to a lack of competition between the three driving schools and instructors, prices has gradually risen annually.

== Gallery of historic images ==
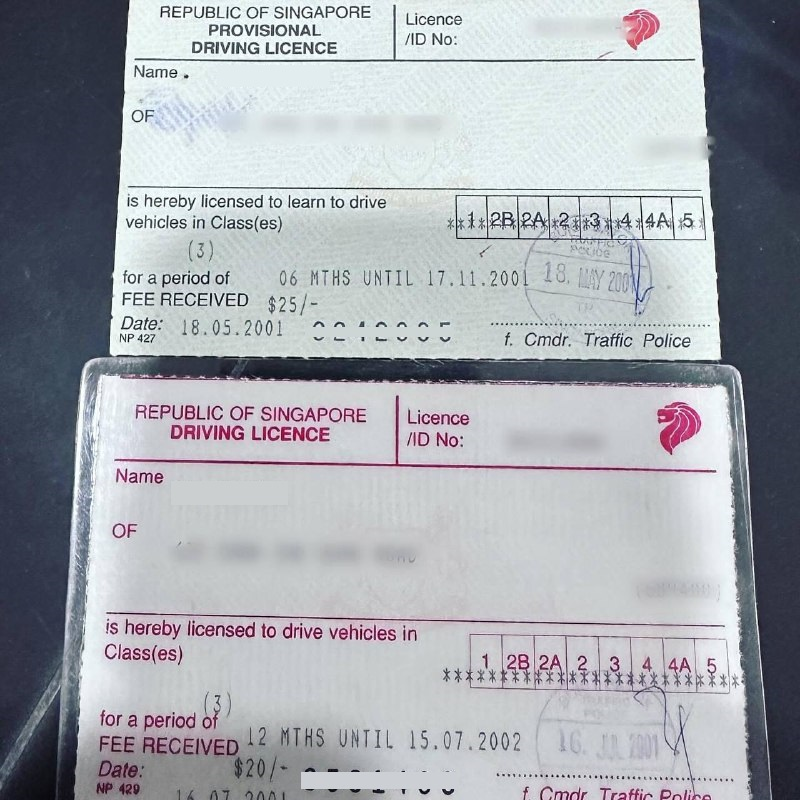
An older provisional driving license (PDL) and qualified driving license (QDL), phased out during the 2000s

== See also ==
- Road signs in Singapore
- Certificate of Entitlement (COE)
