= Pramod Gopalrao Gaikwad =

- Born: 1973 (age 52–53); Nashik, Maharashtra, India
- Education: B.Sc. in Physics from Arts, Science & Commerce College, Satana
- Occupation: Social worker
- Years active: 2007–present
- Organization: Social Networking Forum (SNF)
- Title: Founder

Pramod Gopalrao Gaikwad (born 1973) is an Indian social worker from Maharashtra. He is the founder of the Social Networking Forum, a non-profit organization that undertakes community-based initiatives in rural and tribal areas of the state. Gaikwad is the recipient of the Government of Maharashtra's Adivasi Sevak Puraskar and was recognized as a Water Hero by the Ministry of Jal Shakti in 2020.

== Early life and education ==
Gaikwad was born in Gosrane village, Kalwan taluka, Nashik district, Maharashtra. He is the son of Gopalrao and Rajani Gaikwad, both of whom were government school teachers.

He received his primary education at Zilla Parishad schools in rural Nashik before attending the Government Public School (Shaskiy Vidya Niketan) in Dhule. He later attended the Services Preparatory Institute (SPI) in Aurangabad. Gaikwad completed a Bachelor of Science in Physics from the Arts, Science & Commerce College, Satana, and subsequently earned a Master of Business Administration (MBA) in Finance from the PIRENS Institute of Business Management, Loni.

== Career ==
Gaikwad began community development work in 2007, initially supporting educational programs in tribal schools. In 2010, he began addressing water scarcity and rural development in the tribal regions of Maharashtra.

=== Social Networking Forum (SNF) ===
In 2010, Gaikwad established the Social Networking Forum (SNF), which originated as an online platform for coordinating rural development projects. The organization was formally registered as a non-profit entity in 2014.

=== Library movement ===
In January 2020, Gaikwad launched the Library Movement in Savarne, Nashik district. The initiative involves the conversion of unused community spaces into study centers for rural students. By September 2025, the program had established 29 libraries in tribal villages, providing resources for competitive examination preparation and general literacy.

=== Water security and rural development ===
As of July 2026, the SNF has implemented water infrastructure projects in 36 villages across the Nashik, Nandurbar, and Thane districts. These projects, funded through a combination of community contributions and Corporate Social Responsibility (CSR) grants, provide water access to an estimated 70,000 residents. SNF has also involved local communities in the maintenance of village drinking water systems.

In June 2026, Gaikwad presented a paper titled Water as a Catalyst: A Nexus-Based Model for Tribal Empowerment in Rural India at Singapore International Water Week. The paper examined the relationship between drinking water access and education, health, nutrition and livelihoods in tribal communities of Maharashtra.

In August 2026, SNF completed a drinking water project in Umbarpada, a tribal village in the Peth taluka of Nashik district. The project involved reusing an existing water tank, installing a pipeline and contributions of voluntary labour from local residents.

== Award and recognition ==
- 2015: Global CSR Award presented at the World CSR Day congress.
- 2017: Adivasi Sevak Puraskar, a state-level honor awarded by the Government of Maharashtra for the contributions in tribal development.
- 2018: Keshav Srushti Award in recognition of social work initiatives.
- 2020: Water Hero designation, awarded by the Ministry of Jal Shakti as part of the "Water Heroes: Share Your Stories" contest.
