= Trolleybuses in Singapore =

Singapore trolleybus system
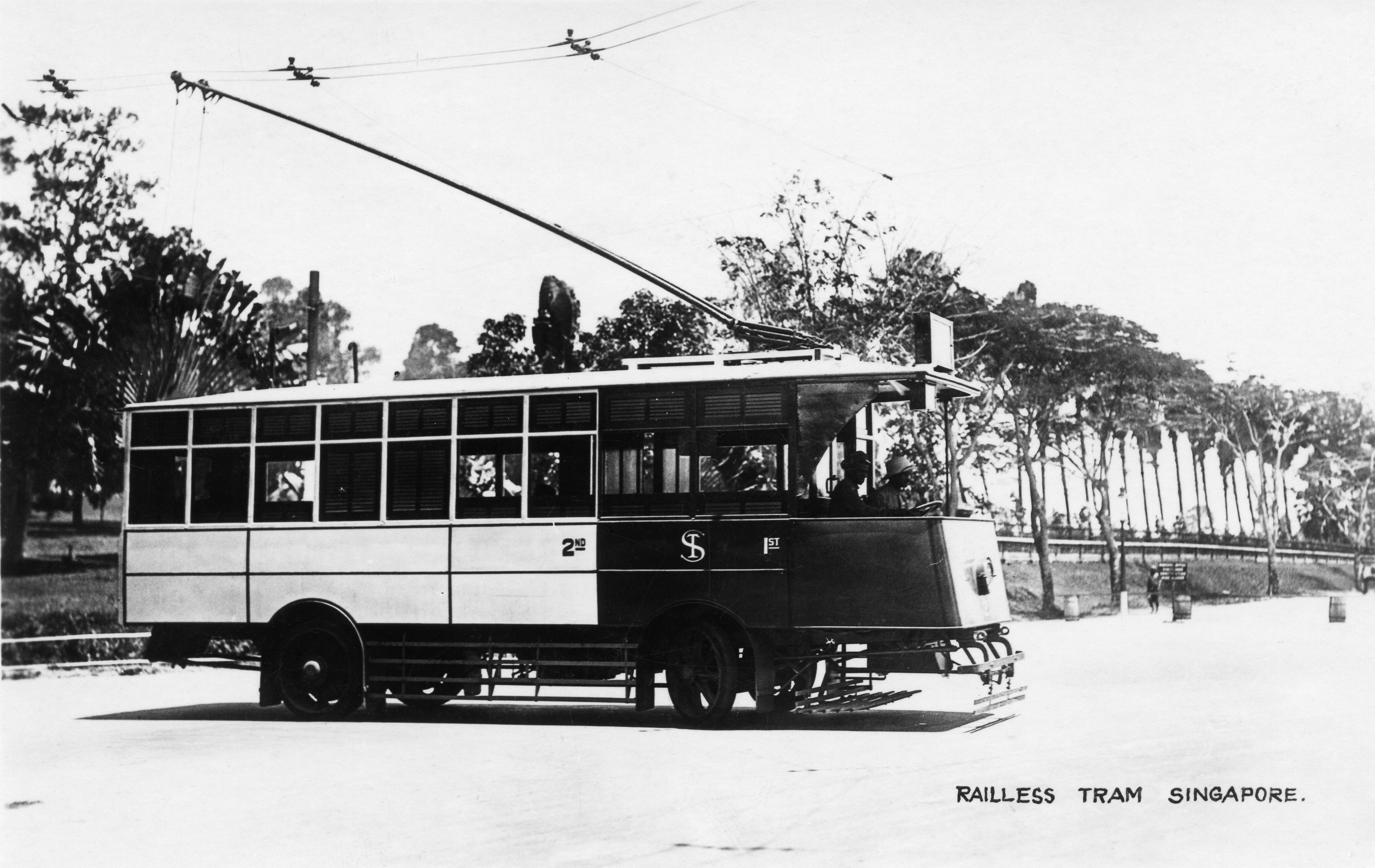
- A Singapore trolleybus c. 1930

Operation
- Locale: Singapore
- Open: 14 August 1926
- Close: 15 December 1962
- Status: Closed
- Operator: Singapore Traction Company

Infrastructure
- Electrification: 540V DC

The Singapore trolleybus system formed part of the transportation network of Singapore from 1926 to 1962. The system was constructed between 1926 and 1927 as a replacement to the Singapore tramway network with the old tram routes converted to trolleybus routes. The network became one of the world's largest in the 1930s, with a total network length of 24.96 miles (40.17 km) and fleet of 108 trolleybuses.

After World War II, the trolleybuses were obsolete and could no longer serve Singapore's transportation needs. By 1962, motor buses had completely replaced the trolleybuses.

== History ==
=== Background ===
In the early 1920s, the tram system in Singapore was in a poor state due to lack of funds and, in 1922, Shanghai Electric Construction Company took over its management. Because of the cost of rehabilitating the deteriorated tram track, Shanghai Electric Construction Company made plans to replace the trams with trolleybuses.

In March 1925, the Legislative Council passed the Singapore Traction Ordinance which authorised the conversion of the tram system to trolleybuses and reorganised the tram operating company into the Singapore Traction Company (STC). The STC was formed in October 1925, and it took over the assets of the old tram operating company.

=== Conversion from trams ===
After its formation, the STC commenced the transition to trolleybuses from trams. In 1926, a fleet of trolleybuses was shipped to Singapore and the first ten became ready for service in April. Trolleybus service began on 14 August 1926 with a fleet of 30 trolleybuses that serviced two routes—Joo Chiat Road–Tanjong Pagar and Upper Cross Street–Outram Road. To inaugurate the service, an illuminated trolleybus ran between Bras Basah, Geylang, and the Singapore General Hospital that evening.

The trolleybuses were initially popular with the public and trolleybus ridership was much higher than that of the trams they replaced. Fare revenue increased by 22 percent between the last quarters of 1925 and 1926. In March 1927, the route conversion between Tank Road and Keppel Harbour was completed. With the conversion of the route between Selegie Road and Bras Basah Road, the move to trolleybuses was completed in September 1927.

=== 1920s to 1940s ===
Problems arose with the trolleybuses soon after their introduction; several fatalities occurred because riders were either alighting or falling from moving trolleybuses. Consequently, the coroner requested that a fitting be made that allowed the conductor of the trolleybus to control passenger exits. As more deaths occurred, the coroner continued to make the same request and, in November 1927, STC decided to install a "central rod at the second-class entrance of each trolleybus." After the coroner's enquiry into a trolleybus fatality that same month, he theorised that the rods would not reduce the number of fatalities until passengers were compelled to wait until the bus had stopped to alight. When a Chinese teenager fell to his death from a trolleybus in 1928, STC installed inward-opening doors at third-class exits on all of its trolleybuses.

By October 1931, the trolleybus network had had almost 40 million riders. In 1933, the Malaya Tribune claimed that the trolleybus system was thought to be the largest in the world with a total route length of 24.96 miles (40.17 km) served by a fleet of 108 buses. In August 1939, new regulations for trolleybuses were implemented that limited their top speed to 25 miles per hour (40 km/h), prohibited advertising be placed on their exterior, and mandated that they be conveniently and brightly lit.

After the fall of Singapore to the Japanese in February 1942, operation of the network was taken over by the local administration and trolleybus services were more or less back to normal by May. First-class service ended in 1943 with the introduction of new single-class trolleybuses; the new fares were based on the prior second-class rates.

=== Postwar and demise ===
After the return of Singapore to British rule, the STC found that of their 108 pre-war trolleybus fleet, only 20 trolleybuses were roadworthy. Trolleybus service was reinstated in September 1945, with the passenger capacity on each bus limited to 45. Due to the insufficient number of trolleybuses available, some of the routes previously served by trolleybuses were served by omnibuses until sufficient trolleybuses were delivered.

In the years after the war, the transport system provided by the trolleybuses and omnibuses proved to be inadequate. A memorandum by the Singapore City Council's vehicles and traffic committee said they were "slow, noisy and unattractive". The trolleybus wires prevented the introduction of double-decker buses on Singapore streets. The STC embarked on a programme to replace the trolleybuses with new Isuzu buses built in Japan. The last trolleybuses, operating on service number 4 from Paya Lebar to Outram Road, ceased operations at midnight on 15 December 1962.

== Fleet ==
The initial set of trolleybuses acquired in 1926 consisted of chassis constructed by the Associated Equipment Company in England and bodies constructed in Shanghai. The buses were shipped to Singapore in kit form and were assembled by workmen at the Tanjong Pagar docks in Singapore. Initially, these trolleybuses had several issues, with a Malaya Tribune reporter noting that they frequently left the wires, a result of the poor construction of the trolley poles' contacts. Nevertheless, the same reporter noted that the buses had a smooth ride and were comfortable. As of the 1930s, the trolleybuses were inspected every two months and fully overhauled every two years.

In 1943, the new single-class trolleybuses were introduced; these had a lower floor then previous types.

After the war in 1945, as part of its rehabilitation programme, the STC ordered 60 new trolleybuses fitted with electrical equipment and pneumatic tyres; the bodies were constructed in Singapore. The new trolleybuses began service in 1946. All of the old trolleybuses were scrapped by November 1948.

== Infrastructure ==
Initially, the trolleybuses were powered by electricity generated by the STC, but the electrical supply was switched to the municipal grid in 1927. Since the trolleybus routes required 540V of direct current, STC owned and operated two substations which converted the municipal grid alternating current to direct current.

== See also ==
- History of Singapore
- Bus transport in Singapore
- List of trolleybus systems
- Trams in Singapore
