= Permanent residency in Singapore =

Permanent residency in Singapore is an immigration status in Singapore, second only to Singaporean citizens in terms of privileges. Collectively, both Singaporean citizens and permanent residents form the country's resident population and are calculated together in terms of census data and statistics.

A permanent resident (PR) of Singapore has most of the rights, privileges, obligations and responsibilities that citizens do, including National Service (NS) obligations for first (when applying as students) and second generation males as well as compulsory Central Provident Fund (CPF) contributions, among others.

However, notable exceptions include not being able to vote in elections or to hold public office, more limited public benefits such as education, medical and housing benefits, lower public government and government-aided school placement priorities as well as some limits on driving for transport services, among others.

== Conditions of status ==
In general, permanent residents of Singapore are permitted to live, work, study, serve, start a business and retire in Singapore indefinitely. PR status is robust in practice but not absolute, and individuals could have their PRs stripped and deported from Singapore if convicted of a crime. Prominent individuals who previously had their PR status reviewed for a possible revocation after being convicted included actors Christopher Lee (Note: Lee was a citizen of Malaysia at the time. His PR was retained, and he subsequently became a citizen a few years later.) for drunk driving and Ian Fang (Note: Fang is a citizen of China.) and Lev Panfilov (Note: Panfilov is a citizen of Russia.) for sexual offences. However, Panfilov was ultimately acquitted after the Court of Appeal ruled that the alleged victim's testimony contained material inconsistencies. Academic Huang Jing, (Note: Huang is a naturalised citizen of the United States. He is also believed to have retained his citizenship of China after naturalisation despite Chinese nationality law de jure not allowing multiple citizenships.) along with his wife, had their PR statuses revoked in 2017 after Huang was alleged to be a foreign agent. Fang's revocation was confirmed in 2026.

PRs are also subject to an active Re-Entry Permit (REP) if they wish to leave Singapore for any length of time for any reason. If a PR leaves Singapore without a valid REP, or if a PR is outside Singapore when his/her REP expires, that individual's PR status automatically and, with rare exceptions, irrevocably ends. Singapore's Immigration and Checkpoints Authority (ICA) generally renews REPs for every 5 years, subject to PRs demonstrating their actual residence and economic, familial or other continued relevant connections to Singapore.

== Eligibility ==
Starting in 2010, Singapore has set an approximately 30,000 annual cap on the number of individuals being granted PRs. There is a relatively stable population of just over 500,000 PRs in Singapore.

Individuals eligible to apply for Singapore PR include:

- spouses and unmarried children (below 21 years old) of Singapore citizens or permanent residents
- aged parents and legal guardians of Singapore citizens
- foreign workers in Singapore possessing valid work passes (Employment Pass, S-Pass), and their dependents (with some exceptions)
- students studying in Singapore
- investors and entrepreneurs

Singapore's Immigration and Checkpoints Authority (ICA) processes PR applications in three different schemes: Family Ties, Professionals/Technical Personnel and Skilled Workers (PTS), and the Global Investor Programme (GIP). ICA receives applications through an online system, and applicants must pay a nonrefundable processing fee. Nobody has an automatic legal right to PR status; the government's PR decisions are entirely discretionary.

The government does not disclose its evaluation criteria or decision processes beyond broad generalities, such as long-term citizen population-related goals. One of the government's stated public policy goals is to maintain relative stability in Singapore's racial and ethnic population proportions in order to promote and maintain racial harmony. Consequently, a PR applicant's family, cultural and ethnic background all influence ICA's decisions. According to ICA, the processing time of PR application is around 6 months, but varies based on the complexity of the case. The processing fee is S$100, which is not refundable.

PR status is central to Singapore nationality law since naturalisation as a Singaporean citizen requires that the applicant first be a PR. PRs can apply for citizenship if at least 6 months have passed since being granted PR.

=== Proof of identity ===
PRs (age 15 and older) are issued blue colored National Registration Identity Cards (NRICs), in contrast to Singaporean citizens which are in pink.

== See also ==
- Immigration to Singapore
- Singaporean nationality law
- Singaporean passport
