= Singapore Traction Company =

Transport company in Singapore

- Type: Public limited company
- Industry: Transport
- Founded: 1 October 1925; 100 years ago
- Defunct: 28 December 1978; 47 years ago
- Headquarters: Singapore
- Area served: Singapore
- Services: Tram, trolleybus and bus service

The Singapore Traction Company (STC) was a tram, trolleybus and motor bus operator in Singapore from 1925 to 1971. Established as a result of the Traction Ordinance in 1925, it was initially owned by the Shanghai Electric Company. The company took over Singapore's tram network, converting it to a trolleybus network by 1927. It acquired its first omnibuses in 1929, took over "mosquito bus" (seven-passenger buses) service in 1933, and became independent of the electric company in 1935.

With only 20 operational trolleybuses at the end of World War II, a programme to restore full service by purchasing new buses was begun during the late 1940s. The company experienced a 15-week strike in 1947, and a 142-day strike over wages from 1955 into 1956.

Trolleybus service ended in December 1962, and the company headquarters was moved from London to Singapore in 1964. By the late 1960s, the STC's financial state had worsened; with the April 1971 repeal of the Traction Ordinance, its losses mounted. With the company near bankruptcy, its buses were sold to Singapore's three other bus companies and the STC ceased operation in December 1971.

== History ==
=== Background ===
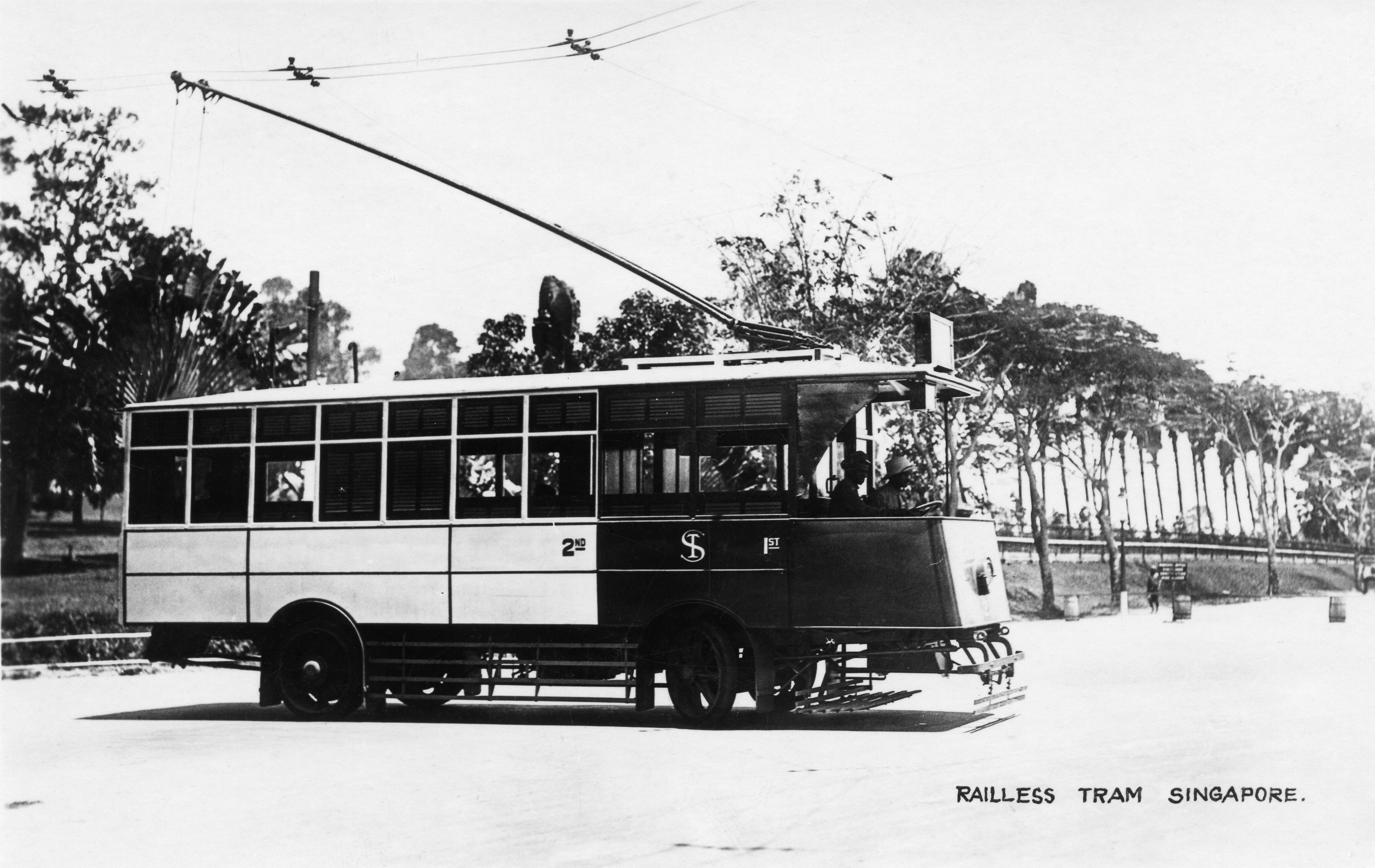
Singapore Traction Company trolleybus, c. 1930

The Shanghai Electric Company (SEC), which operated a trolleybus network in Shanghai, was approached to rehabilitate the Singapore tramway network during the early 1920s. Due to the poor state of the tram infrastructure, rehabilitation was deemed too costly and plans were made to convert the system to trolleybuses.

The SEC began negotiations with Singapore's municipal government over a new traction ordinance. The ordinance included the conversion of the tram system to trolleybuses and the restructuring of the old tramway company.

=== Establishment and conversion of tram system ===
The STC was established in 1925 in accordance with the Singapore Traction (Transfer) Ordinance, which was passed by the Legislative Council in March of that year, to take over Singapore's tram network from Singapore Electric Traction and replace it with trolleybuses. The first two trolleybus routes began operation on 14 August 1926, and the last tram line was converted on 4 September 1927.

The company received approval to operate motor buses on its existing trolleybus routes in 1929, and operated an experimental route between Geylang and Finlayson Green with seven buses. The buses, introduced to reduce travel time, were noted by a reporter for The Straits Times as having a smooth, comfortable ride. The motor-bus service was then expanded with the introduction of a route to Seletar in July of that year.

STC revenue declined by £20,000 from 1931 to 1932 (during the Great Depression), due to the continuation of service despite reduced demand. By 1933, the company operated what was claimed to be the largest trolleybus network in the world: 24.96 mi (40.17 km) long, served by 108 vehicles. That year, negotiations began on articles and amendments to the management agreement to release the STC from Shanghai Electric Company control.

=== Mosquito-bus takeover ===
In 1933, with the failure of Southern Omnibus Services, the municipal government decided to transfer all mosquito-bus service to the STC by replacing the service with new routes and extending existing ones. The replacement of mosquito buses on the first few routes prompted commuter complaints about overcrowding, and the Municipal Commission recommended adjusting the route timetables. The STC added buses to its fleet and began express service on the Tampines Road route, the route with the most problems.

The company bought out its Shanghai Electric Company ownership for £100,000 in 1935. The deal was delayed, however, when the Chancery Court granted an injunction to the Investment Trust Corporation and other STC shareholders because the STC did not have the required money. The STC successfully appealed the injunction on 1 May 1935. The management agreement between the companies was terminated in October of that year, when payment was made.

In September and October 1936, STC bus drivers and conductors struck twice over split shifts and harsh working conditions. Two years later, STC workers went on strike again after four months of negotiations with the company failed. The strike continued for 15 days, with strikers unwilling to negotiate with the company until the government stepped in to arbitrate. The strikers were unwilling to accept arbitration, and the strike continued for almost a month before service resumed on 22 August 1938.

=== 1940s and 1950s ===
Only 20 trolleybuses were found fit for service when Singapore returned to British rule, and operations were limited until new buses could be delivered. The restoration of full service was also delayed by a 15-week strike in 1947 over wages. Concerns about overcrowding on STC buses were also raised frequently in the media and by the Municipal Commission, and fines for breaches of regulation were increased in 1950. The company introduced buses for schoolchildren in April 1950, in response to a request made six months earlier.

In September 1955, the STC refused to accept demands for 60- to 70-percent wage increases and over 2,800 employees went on strike. Although some of the workers attempted to run a free bus service, they were prevented from doing so. The STC chairman flew to Singapore for negotiations at the Labour Ministry, but no progress was made. Negotiations resumed in December 1955, reaching an impasse after a few days.

The government convened a court of inquiry for the dispute, which recommended a wage increase. Management rejected the recommendations, saying that the company would incur a loss. After Chief Minister David Marshall warned that the STC might have its franchise cancelled, the company backed down and bus service resumed on the afternoon of 16 February 1956.

=== Demise ===
The STC discontinued trolleybus operations in December 1962. In January 1964, the company transferred its headquarters from London to Singapore; the Singapore company was formed by a new board, and the London company was voluntarily liquidated. Most of the company's shareholders were in Malaysia, and greater opportunity for expansion was possible in Singapore.

By 1966, as a result of competition from illegal taxi operations (which resulted in the loss of about six million passengers in 1965), the STC was operating at a loss of $1 million per year. The company was unable to meet its payroll or acquire new buses, and its directors considered voluntary liquidation. The government's seizure of 1,000 pirate taxis and the resulting reduction of operating losses in 1967 averted the STC's financial collapse. However, the company continued to incur losses for the rest of the 1960s.

In April 1971, with the adoption of the Wilson Report by the government, the Traction Ordinance was repealed and the STC had to compete on an equal footing with Singapore's other bus companies. The company's losses increased to $13,000 per day, leaving it nearly bankrupt.

It was learned in November 1971 that the United Bus Company had made a bid for the STC's bus operations, with negotiations between the companies directed by the government. The following month, the STC concluded negotiations with the three other bus companies for the sale of its buses for about $2.7 million. In addition to acquiring the buses, the three companies hired 2,000 STC employees (including 1,700 drivers and conductors). Several mechanical workers were hired by the Ministry of Defence, and others were registered at Labour Ministry employment exchanges in Havelock and Bendemeer Roads.

The company was placed in receivership by the Chung Kiaw Bank on 21 December 1971. The STC's Upper Aljunied Road bus depot was purchased by the three Chinese bus companies in 1972 for about $2 million, and its Mackenzie Road property was taken over by the government. Unsuccessful efforts were made to salvage the company over the next five years, and it was wound up in 1978.

== Fleet ==
The initial fleet of trolleybuses acquired in 1926 consisted of chassis built by the Associated Equipment Company in England and bodies constructed in Shanghai, with assembly in Singapore. The trolleybuses, with a capacity of 32 passengers, had a two-class layout. The STC began replacing its 20-seat, petrol-powered motor buses with 30-seat heavy-oil buses during the late 1930s as part of a fleet renewal programme.

After World War II, nearly all the company's buses were unusable as a result of deferred maintenance and the use of poor-quality lubricants during the Japanese occupation. The STC ordered new omnibuses and trolleybuses from the United Kingdom, which came into service in 1946 and 1947 respectively. The bus chassis were built in the United Kingdom, and the bodies were assembled in Singapore. By 1949, all but 10 of the STC's buses were modern vehicles ordered after the war; the total carrying capacity was higher than the pre-war level by 1950.

In 1954, as part of an expansion programme, the STC acquired 24 new 8-foot-wide (2.4 m) omnibuses and Singapore's first 30-foot-long (9.1 m) buses. The 30-foot buses, which had lighter aluminium chassis, were ordered as part of a plan to move the STC fleet towards fewer, larger buses. The company began a programme to convert its buses to aluminium bodies in March 1956, and invested $2 million in aluminium-body buses from Britain.

In 1962, the STC replaced its trolleybus fleet with 35 Isuzu buses. The Japanese-built buses had automatic doors, telescopic shock absorbers and air suspension. In 1967, the STC acquired 50 37-seat Nissan buses at a cost of $1.5 million to serve the Toa Payoh housing estate. To pay for the buses, the company mortgaged its Mackenzie Road properties.
