= Trams in Singapore =

Coordinates: 1°17′43″N 103°51′11″E

Singapore tramway networks
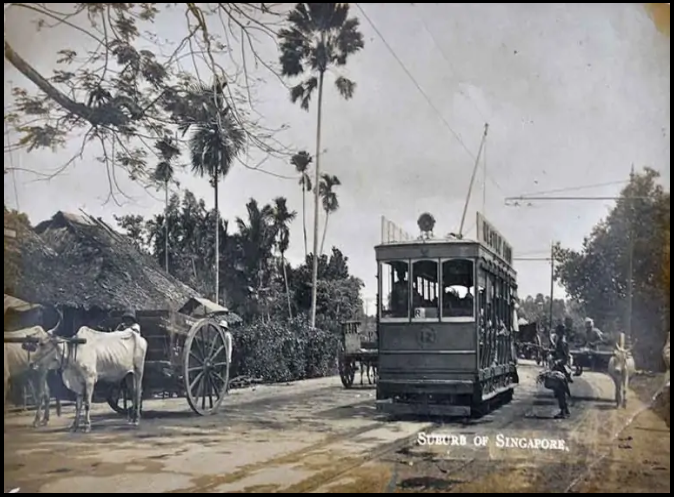
- A Singapore electric tram, Upper Serangoon Road, 1900.

Operation
- Locale: Singapore

Statistics
Steam tramway era: 1886–1894
- Status: Closed
- Operators: Singapore Tramways Company; Tanjong Pagar Docks Company
- Track gauge: 1,000 mm (3 ft 3 3/8 in) metre gauge
- Propulsion system: Steam
Electric tram era: 1905–1927
- Status: Closed
- Operators: Singapore Electric Tramways, Limited
- Track gauge: 1,000 mm
- Propulsion system: Electricity

Singapore has had two tramway networks forming part of its public transport arrangements. Both networks were relatively unsuccessful and short lived.

== History ==
=== Steam trams ===
A steam tram service by the Singapore Tramways Company operated with limited success from 3 May 1886 to 1894. After the implementation of the Tramways Ordinance, No. XII of 1882, which regulated the construction, maintenance and working of tramways in Singapore, planning and specification of the steam tram service commenced. By October 1884 the delivery of materials from England and Scotland for the rail construction had started.

It was planned to lay a double line of rails along Anson Road, Robinson Quay, Collyer Quay, Market Street, and Boat Quay and a single line along Tanjong Pagar Road, South Bridge Road, North Bridge Road, Middle Road and Serangoon Road. The manufacture of 14 tram cars, each with 32 second-class seats and six first-class seats, was also planned. Each car would be open at the sides and have transverse seats, with waterproof curtains suspended from longitudinal brass rods. For the transportation of goods, 40 wagons, made entirely of malleable iron and steel, were planned to be used.

The laying of the first rails started on 7 April 1885. The first regular steam tram service from Tanjong Pagar to Johnston's Pier began on 3 May 1886. The trams were in competition with the cheaper rickshaws, and passengers were reluctant to pay tram fares of 10 cents or 6 cents for the first- and second-class seats respectively. The fuel for the steam locomotives had to be imported. After just three years of operation, Singapore Tramways Company offered themselves to be bought by the Tanjong Pagar Dock Company, but the sale wasn't closed.

In December 1889, a public auction was held by Messrs. Crane Brothers to find a buyer for the Singapore Tramways Company. The company was sold for $186,000 to the New Harbour Dock Company Limited, a sum probably below the scrap value. Under the new management, the tram line from Tanjong Pagar to Rochor was decommissioned, and in 1892 only the line from Borneo Wharf down Anson Road to Collyer Quay was kept in use for transporting goods. On 1 June 1894, tram service between New Harbour Dock, Tanjong Pagar and Collyer Quay was also discontinued due to the financial losses, bringing to an end the era of steam trams in Singapore.

=== Electric trams ===
On 24 July 1905 the first electric trams in Singapore were inaugurated. When the Municipal Authorities in Singapore implemented the Tramways Ordinance in 1902, the company Singapore Tramways Limited was registered in London to build and operate a tramway system. On 29 March 1905, Singapore Electric Tramways Ltd took over the management.

The public did not like to use the trams because of high fares in comparison with those of London and a complicated payment structure as well as infrastructural deficiencies and technical issues. Tram rides were initially charged by the number of sections in a route or by the full distance of the route, with fares in the range between 10 and 20 cents which was more expensive than well established modes of transport such as rickshaws or horse-drawn carriages. The price for a ride was finally reduced to 3 cents per section, so that by 1909 an average of 32,000 paying passengers a day used the trams.

After obtaining consultancy by the Shanghai Electric Construction Company, tram operations were upgraded in 1922, including refurbishment of the tramcars and revised fares. In 1923, the Singapore Traction Ordinance was proposed. It was implemented in October 1925. As a consequence, the trams were replaced by trolleybuses on 4 September 1927.

== Lines ==
There were 6 tramway lines with a similar track layout to that of the former steam trams. The routes connected Telok Blangah Road to Keppel Road, Tanjong Pagar Road to Geylang Road, Anson Road to Johnston's Pier, Bras Basah Road to Serangoon Road, Serangoon Road to Kallang Road, and High Street to Tank Road.

== See also ==
- History of Singapore
- List of town tramway systems in Asia
- Rail transport in Singapore
- Trolleybuses in Singapore
