= Road signs in Singapore =

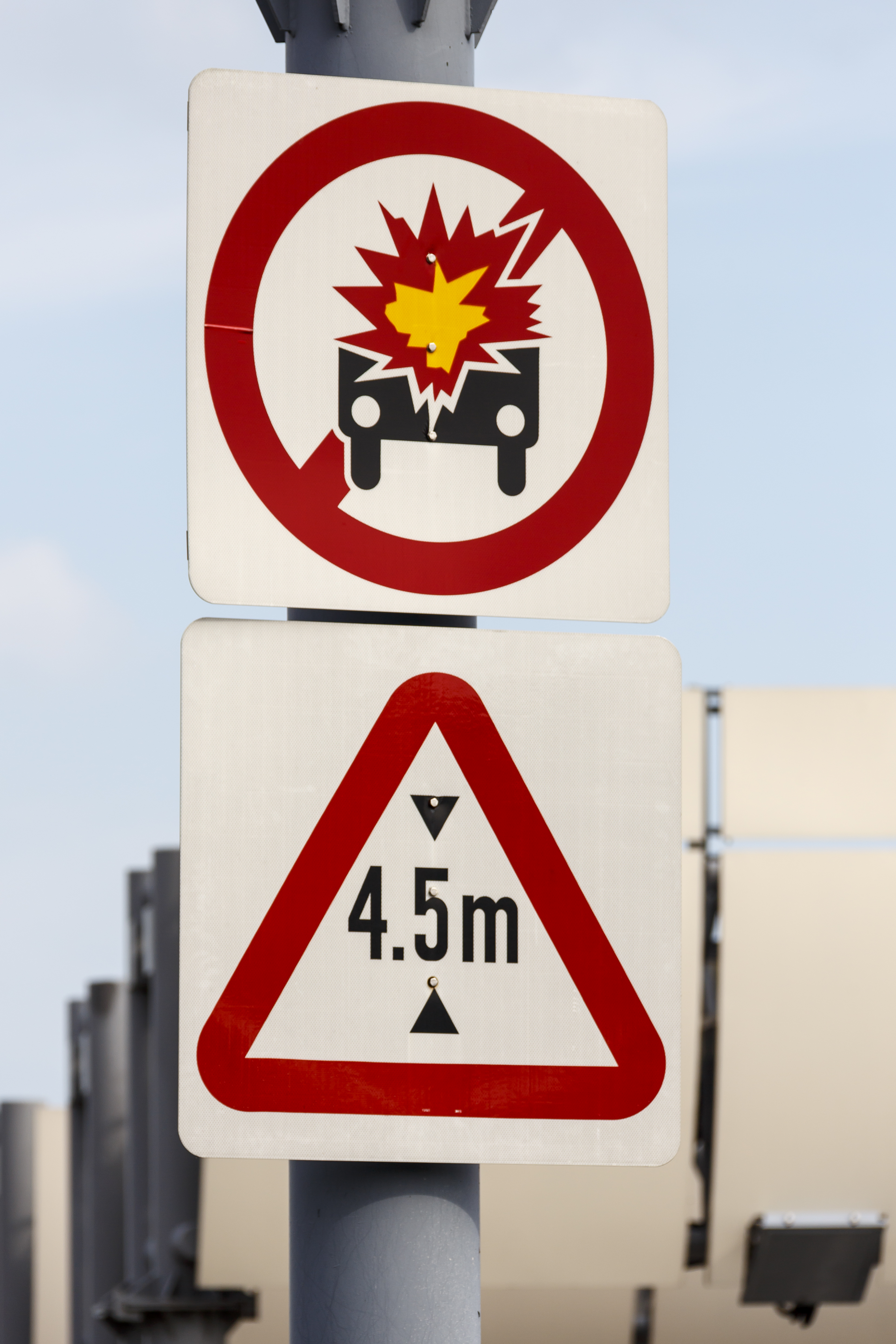
Series of prohibition signs in Singapore

Road signs in Singapore closely follow those laid down in the United Kingdom's traffic sign regulations, although a number of changes over the years have introduced some slight deviations that suit local road conditions (such as fonts). Road signs in Singapore conform to the local Highway Code under the authority of Singapore Traffic Police.

The typeface used, which is regulated by the Land Transport Authority, has no official name. It is also used on road signs in Brunei.

Since the mid-1990s, signs have been placed on a backing board, making them square or rectangular and standardised to a width of 600 mm on most roads and 900 mm on expressways. Prior to the 1990s and after 1964, signs were cut out to their shape (for example, round signs were cut to be circular) as in most countries around the world. Prior to 1964, signs were in the pre-Worboys style with a couple of differences.

Singapore traffic signs display text in English, one of the four official languages and the main language in the country. The three others — Malay, Chinese, and Tamil, are also used for important public places such as tourist attractions, airports and immigration checkpoints.

== Warning signs ==
Warning signs indicate possible dangers or unusual conditions ahead and alert motorists, so they may anticipate the appropriate actions to take. They are usually shaped as triangles with a red border, and mounted on a borderless white backing board.

Danger

Other dangers nearby

Advance warning of a height restriction ahead

Accident blackspot

Restricted Zone ahead

Electronic Road Pricing (road toll) gantry ahead

Road Hump

Uneven road

Road narrows on right

Road narrows on both sides ahead

Two-way traffic crosses a one-way road

Two-way traffic ahead

Lanes merge ahead

Double curve first to left (or to the right if the symbol is reversed)

Dual carriageway ends

Crossroads

Side road on left

Side road on right

T-junction

Traffic merging from left

Staggered junction

Roundabout ahead

Traffic lights ahead

Traffic queues expected ahead

Slippery road

Steep ascent

Steep descent

Quayside or river bank ahead

Tunnel ahead

Low flying aircraft

Pedestrian crossing

Curve to the right ahead (Left if symbol is reversed)

School zone

Beware of Animals

Pedestrians on road ahead

Elderly or blind people ahead

Slow down

Maintain a slow speed to anticipate hazards ahead

Bridge with low headroom ahead

Chevron

== Regulatory signs ==
Regulatory signs either mandatory, which give positive instructions, or prohibitory, which indicate a prohibition. Many regulatory signs are accompanied by supplementary plates that provide interdependent exceptions to the rule, or indicates additional instruction or information to facilitate understanding of the rule implemented.

=== Mandatory signs ===
Mandatory signs are generally circular with a white border and symbol on a blue background. They usually indicate something all drivers must do (e.g. keep left) or a facility available to certain classes of traffic (e.g. pedal cycles only).

Ahead only (Turning left and right is prohibited)

Turn left ahead (right if symbol is reversed)

Turn left (right if symbol is reversed)

Keep left (Right if symbol is reversed)

Split-way, i.e. motorists can pass to either side, but either side might not reach the same destination

Route to be used by pedal bicycles only

Route to be used by motorcycles only

=== Priority signs ===
The exceptions are the octagonal red STOP sign, the temporary STOP and GO signs and the triangular GIVE WAY sign.

Stop and give way

Stop, children crossing

Give way

Temporary stop signs

Temporary go signs

=== Prohibitory signs ===
Prohibitory signs, which generally tell drivers what they must not do, are mostly circular and have a red border. The red ring indicates the prohibition; diagonal bars are used only on signs which prohibit a specific manoeuvre, i.e. banned left or right turns and U-turns, or a certain class of vehicle, i.e. lorries

No entry

No left turn

No right turn

No trucks

No vehicles with 3 axles or more

No vehicles carrying dangerous goods into tunnels

No pedal bicycles

No Waiting

No stopping

No overtaking

No horning, unless to prevent an accident

No jaywalking

No jaywalking in the bus park

Diagonal bars are excluded when restrictions are quantitative in nature, i.e. limits in speed, weight, axle, height, and width.

No vehicles over height shown. Vehicles taller than 4.5m requires a police escort.

No vehicles over width shown

No vehicles over weight shown

Maximum speed limit in kilometres per hour (km/h)

== Information signs ==
Information signs are signs that may be mounted to indicate a certain condition or nature of the road ahead that motorists need to take note. They are independent of existing mandatory and prohibitive signs. Such signs are usually white or blue and rectangular in shape.

U-turn allowed DIRECTLY AFTER the sign. Do not U-turn when there is no sign.

One-way traffic

Pedestrian crossing

Parking Area for all vehicles - owned by HDB (in mostly Transport typeface)

Parking zone for cars - Coupon Payment (in Transport typeface)

Parking zone for Motor- Coupon Payment (in Transport typeface)

Dead end

Dead end on the left ahead

Dead end on the right ahead

End of restricted zone

Keep a safe distance from vehicle in front

Speed regulating strips ahead

Right turn lanes ahead

Watch out for traffic from side road

Reminder to look out & give way to pedestrians crossing when making a right turn

When "B" lights up in green, public buses from left lane proceed before green light for all other vehicles

When "B" lights up in green, public buses proceed after exiting bus bay before green light for all other vehicles

Advisory Give-way-to-buses-exiting-bus-bay rule ahead

Mandatory Give-way-to-buses-exiting-bus-bay rule ahead

Speed camera ahead

Red light camera

Expressway

End of expressway

Concealed exit ahead. Watch out for traffic coming from a concealed side road.

U-Turning vehicles keep right

Do not drive on the road shoulder

Dual carriageway ahead

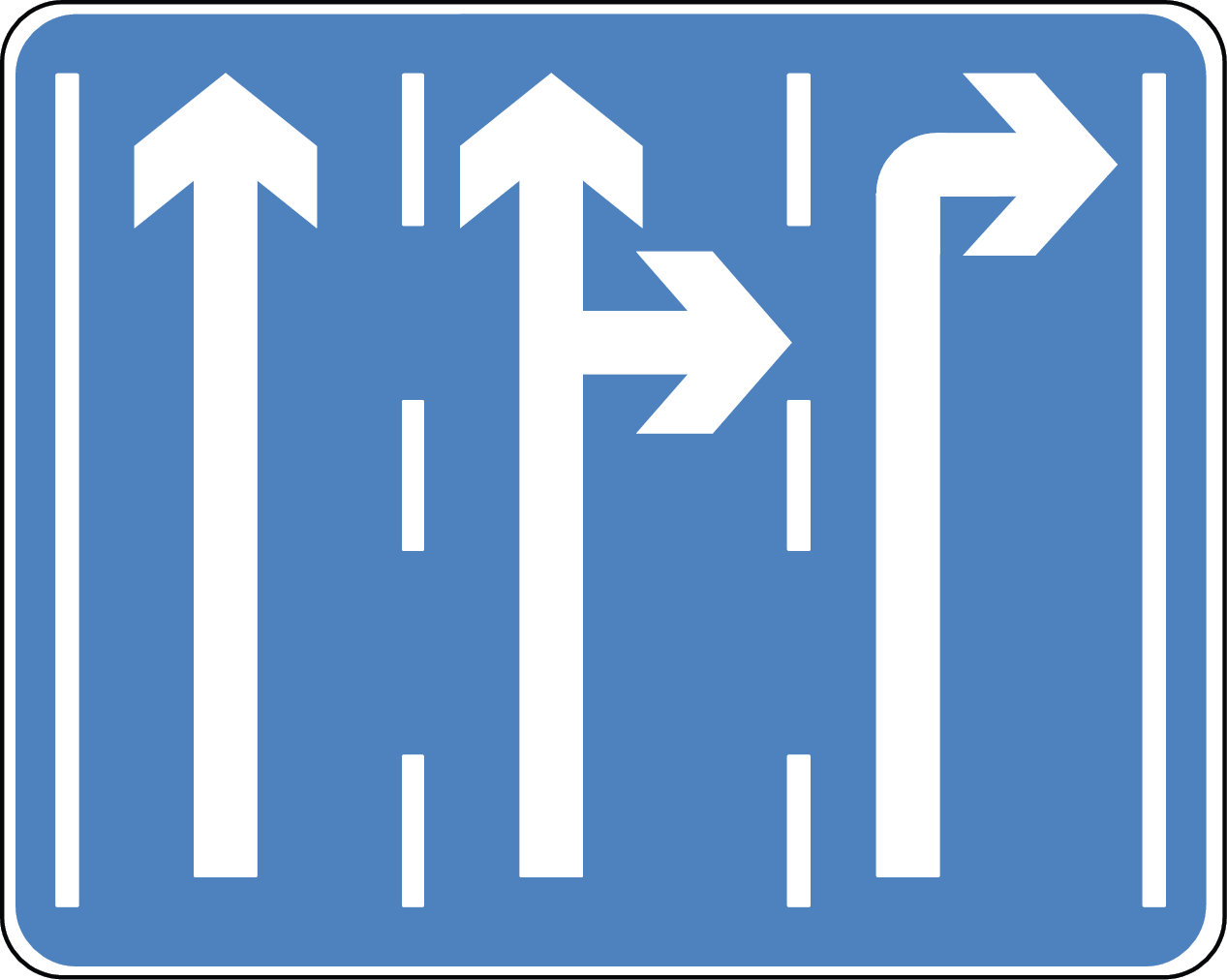
Layout of traffic lanes ahead (for lane formation)

Expressway name and distance marker

== Temporary work-zone signs ==
Temporary work-zone signs (designated in amber orange signages) are mounted to ensure road users are notified in advance despite being affected by road works in the vicinity. It closely follows the American MUTCD traffic sign (e.g. reddish orange diamond, reddish orange rectangular or amber rectangular-shaped signs).

Advance sign of road works ahead

Indication of road stretch affected by road works

Entry to works area

Heavy vehicles turning ahead

Heavy vehicles turning ahead

Layout of lanes ahead

Road narrows on right ahead

Slow

Slow down

Temporary roundabout

Temporary mandatory speed limit (40 km/h)

Temporary traffic lights ahead

Curve to right (Left if symbol is reversed)

Supplementary plate to specify direction indicated for temporary road rule

Beware Of Turning Vehicles

Chevron

Temporary Height limit

Detour for pedestrians in direction indicated (Right)

Other dangers nearby

== Directional signs ==
- Signs indicating destinations reached via expressways has white lettering on a blue background.
- Signs indicating destinations reached via other roads have white lettering on a green background.
- Signs indicating local destinations have black lettering on a white background.
- Signs indicating recreational facilities and landmarks have white lettering on a brown background.
On approach to a junction (single direction)

At the junction

On approach to a roundabout

Get in lane with respect to the destinations stated above each downward-pointing lane arrow

Direction to a place of interest

== Road markings ==
=== Along the side of the road ===
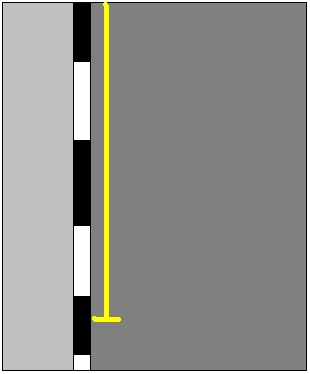
No parking between 7 am to 7 pm (Daily with the exception of Sundays and Public Holidays)

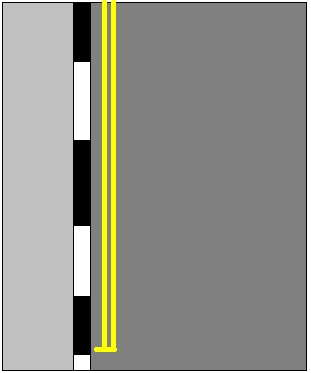
Option 1 (Advisory) No waiting at any time, unless there are signs that specifically indicate seasonal restrictions.

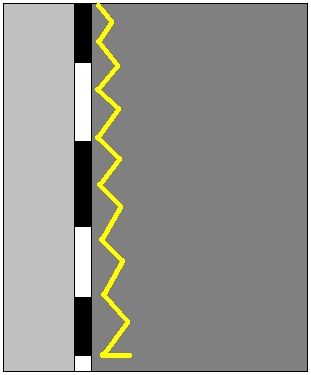
Option 2 (Mandatory) No waiting at any time, unless there are signs that specifically indicate seasonal restrictions.

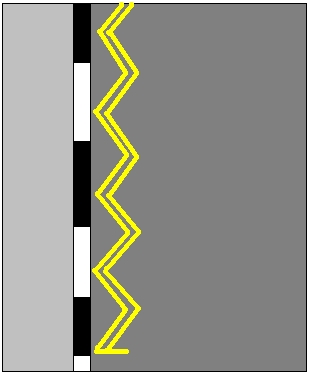
Clearway (No stopping) on that side of the road at any time

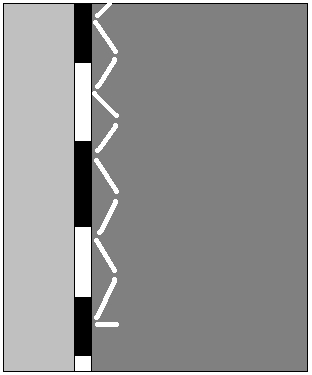
Indication of a zebra crossing ahead.

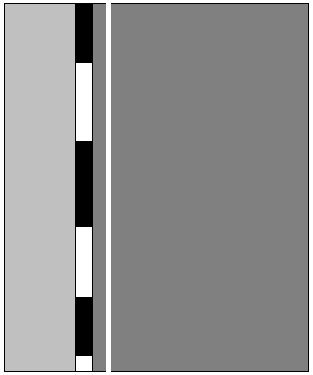
Edge line (used along roads, not in built-up areas, or divide the road shoulder of an expressway from the inside lane)

=== Road dividers ===
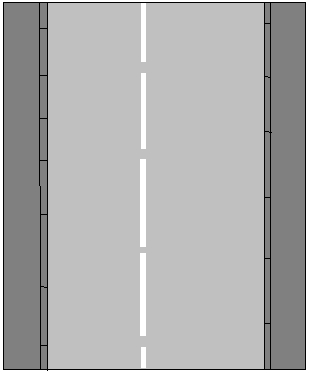
Keep left of the divider

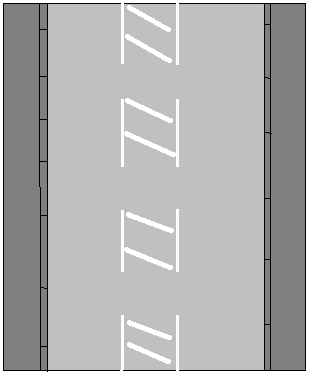
Keep left of the diagonally hatched divider

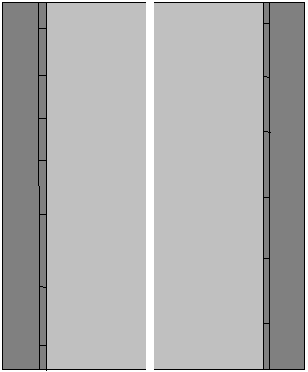
Keep left of the divider; no waiting on either side of the road at any time

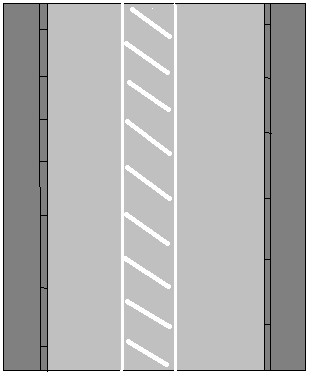
Keep left of the unbroken diagonally hatched divider; No crossing of the divider

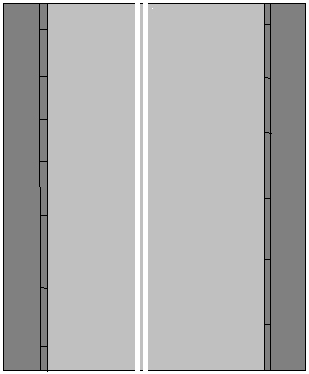
Keep left of the divider; no crossing of the divider in either direction at any time.

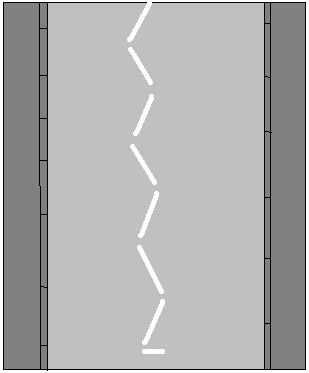
Zebra crossing ahead; keep left of the divider.

== Historic signs ==
The following signs are historical, and are now obsolete.

=== Post-Worboys ===
National Speed Limit Applies (1964–1990s)

No U-turn (1964–1990s)

Indication of a U-turn lane, on the lane closest to the road divider or carriageway (1964–1990s)

Level crossing with gates (prior to June 2011)

Level crossing with no gates (prior to June 2011)

Level crossing (prior to June 2011)

Left turn on red permitted (prior to 2024)

=== Pre-Worboys ===
No Through Road For Motor Vehicles

No Entry

No Right Turn

Cross Roads

Turn Left

Keep Left

Road Works Ahead

Ford

No Waiting

No Entry

No Cycling

Speed Limit

National Speed Limit Applies

Parking

Cross Roads

Speed Limit except Built-up Areas

Turn Right

Roundabout

No Left Turn

Signals Ahead

Two Way Traffic

Level Crossing with No Gates

Halt at major road ahead

Slow, major road ahead

Motor vehicles prohibited

== See also ==
- Road names in Singapore
