= World Cities Summit =

International conference series

The World Cities Summit is an international conference series on public governance and the sustainable development of cities.

== 2008 ==
The first World Cities Summit, which took place in Singapore from 23 to 25 June 2008, focused on the theme of “Liveable and Vibrant Cities”. The inaugural summit in June 2008 brought together 800 senior delegates. These included leaders, government ministers, city mayors, senior government officials, officials from international organisations, business leaders, academics from the Asia-Pacific region and the Middle East, policy makers and civil society.

Among the issues examined were the effective governance, urban planning, infrastructural development, environmental sustainability, climate change, quality of life and economic competitiveness.

Speakers who attended include Haruhiko Kuroda, President of the Asian Development Bank; Anna Tibaijuka, Executive Director of the United Nations Human Settlements Programme; Lee Hsien Loong, Prime Minister of Singapore; Peter Rowe, professor of architecture and urban design at Harvard University; and the mayors of cities such as Melbourne, Yokohama, Bogotá and Wellington, among others. There was also an exhibition to promote business links between the public and private sectors.

The summit was organised by Singapore's Ministry of National Development, the Singapore Civil Service College and the National University of Singapore’s Lee Kuan Yew School of Public Policy. The World Bank, Asian Development Bank, United Nations Development Programme, United Nations Environment Programme, United Nations Human Settlements Programme (UN-HABITAT) and the United Nations Economic and Social Commission for Asia and the Pacific are involved as strategic partners. The summit was held in conjunction with the East Asia Summit Conference on Liveable Cities, as well as the Singapore International Water Week 2008, a water industry conference and trade show.

With increasing urbanisation and half the world’s population already living in cities, the liveability of urban centres has attracted considerable attention in recent years, especially given the increasing awareness of environmental sustainability issues and resource scarcity. There are now several “World's Most Liveable Cities” type rankings, such as the Mercer Quality of Living Survey and The Economist's World's Most Liveable Cities, which undertake international comparisons based on living conditions and quality of life. The Economist's “liveability ranking”, for example, looks at more than 130 cities and measures them against five sets of criteria: infrastructure, culture and environment, healthcare, education and stability.

Initiatives such as the World Mayor Award seek to highlight what can be done to improve the well-being of cities and communities through good leadership. And the C40 Large Cities Climate Summit, also known as the Large Cities Climate Leadership Group, saw representatives from the world's largest cities and businesses gathering in New York in 2007 to discuss the reduction of carbon emissions in urban areas, where three-quarters of global energy consumption occurs.

== 2010 ==
The second biennial World Cities Summit (WCS) 2010, to be held from 28 June to 1 July, returns with an even larger number of leading international speakers, representing diverse cities in the Americas, Europe, Africa, the Middle East and Asia. Some of the notable figures include Mr Kamal Nath, India's Minister of Road Transport and Highways, Mrs Carrie Lam, Secretary of Development in Hong Kong SAR, Mom Rajawongse Sukhumbhand Paribatra, Governor of Bangkok, Anna K. Tibaijuka, Executive Director of UN-HABITAT, Haruhiko Kuroda, President of the Asian Development Bank and Mr James Adams, Vice President of the East Asia and Pacific Region, World Bank. Some 16 ministers, 31 governors and mayors, and more than 40 high level experts from Asia, the Middle East, Europe, and the United States have confirmed their attendance thus far.

These and other speakers will gather in Singapore to address issues on the practical aspects of city governance and integrated approaches to urban development under the Summit's theme of ‘Liveable and Sustainable Cities for the Future’.

Jointly organised by the Centre for Liveable Cities (CLC) and the Singapore Civil Service College (CSC), this year's Summit expects over 1,000 delegates, up from 800 delegates in 2008, comprising ministers, governors, mayors, senior government officials and business leaders. Event highlights include the World Mayors Forum, the World Cities Summit Expo, several Expert Panel Sessions, and various Learning Journeys.

Despite having the third highest population density in the world, Singapore is often rated as one of the world's most liveable cities. One such ranking is the Mercer's 2009 Quality of Life survey, which identifies Singapore as the highest ranking Asian city among 215 cities globally and the highest ranking city worldwide for city infrastructure. As host nation of the biennial Summit, Singapore is well placed to share its expertise in specific areas such as public housing, waste management, green infrastructure, and urban planning.

The World Cities Summit commenced with high-level plenary sessions which explore the theme of “Liveable and Sustainable Cities for the Future” in different dimensions. Attended by ministers and senior policy makers, business leaders, practitioners and futurists, the plenary sessions will deal with cross-cutting issues around the interplay of people, technologies and markets facing cities today, with specific emphasis on leadership and governance, sustainable and eco-friendly cities as well as harmonious and sustainable communities.

Complementing the plenary discussions, there will be a series of high-level Expert Panel Sessions for government representatives, policy makers and specific industry experts to discuss the challenges and solutions faced by cities around the world in greater details, covering areas of urban planning, infrastructure financing, public housing, built environment, waste management, climate change and urban biodiversity.

These urban initiatives should incorporate principles of sustainable development and demonstrate an ability to bring social, economic and environmental benefits in holistic way to communities around the world. The Prize will also place an emphasis on practical and cost effective solutions and ideas that can be easily replicated across cities. The inaugural Lee Kuan Yew World Cities is co-organised by the Urban Redevelopment Authority of Singapore (URA) and Centre for Liveable Cities (CLC).

In 2008, more than half of the world's population lived in cities, and global demographic trends indicate that the degree of urbanization will increase and that more people will live in them. Biodiversity will play an increasingly important role within the urban landscape. Singapore manages to retain a rich array of biodiversity by virtue of its geographical location within a biodiversity hotspot. Therefore, Singapore is well suited and equipped with relevant expertise to establish a cities' biodiversity index.

Hence, Singapore's Minister for National Development, Mr Mah Bow Tan, proposed the establishment of an index to measure biodiversity in cities at the 9th Meeting of the Parties to the Convention on Biological Diversity in Bonn, Germany in May 2008. To lay out the details for the index, the Secretariat of the Convention on Biological Diversity and the National Parks Board of Singapore jointly organised a Technical Expert Workshop on The Singapore Index on Cities' Biodiversity. 17 technical experts on biodiversity indicators as well as city executives responsible for implementation and management of biodiversity and urban projects attended the workshop.

The Singapore Index on Cities' Biodiversity would measure performance and assign scores based on three categories:

- Biodiversity - the number of plant, animal and other species that exist in a city
- The services that these plants and animals provide, such as pollination and as carbon sinks
- How well a city manages its biodiversity - for instance, by setting up a conservation agency or a museum to document species and habitats

The Index will be presented for endorsement during the 10th Meeting of the Parties to the Convention on Biological Diversity in Nagoya, Japan in October 2010.

A User's Manual for the Singapore Index on Cities’ Biodiversity is available online. More information about biodiversity conservation in Singapore is available from the National Biodiversity Centre.

== 2014 ==
Suzhou won the Lee Kuan Yew World City Prize in 2014 for its transformation over the prior two decades, including transitioning to a service economy, cultural conservation during its modernisation, and its policies regarding migrant workers.

== List of Lee Kuan Yew World City Prize Laureates ==
=== Winners by Year ===
Year	City	Country	Continent
2010	Bilbao	Spain	Europe
2012	New York City	United States	North America
2014	Suzhou	China	Asia
2016	Medellín	Colombia	South America
2018	Seoul	South Korea	Asia
2020	Vienna	Austria	Europe
2024	Mexico City	Mexico	North America
2026	London	United Kingdom	Europe
