= Singapore International Water Week =

The Singapore International Water Week (SIWW) is a conference in Singapore for the global water industry.

SIWW's flagship programmes include The Water Leaders Summit, the Water Convention, the Water Expo, Business Forums, Hydro-Gen and Industrial Water Solutions. The programme culminates with the Lee Kuan Yew Water Prize.

SIWW was launched in 2008. Since 2012, SIWW has been held biennially in conjunction with the World Cities Summit and CleanEnviro Summit Singapore. In 2013, the attention was focused on the water utility sector with the SIWW Water Utilities Leaders Forum (SWULF).

In 2018, the SIWW featured and served NEWBrew, a beer brewed from NEWater.

In 2021, the SIWW was held virtually.
