= Jubilee clock =

Clock towers

Jubilee clock is a term used in reference to a number of clocks constructed and erected throughout the British Empire in commemoration of the Golden or Diamond Jubilee of various British monarchs, most commonly, Queen Victoria's.

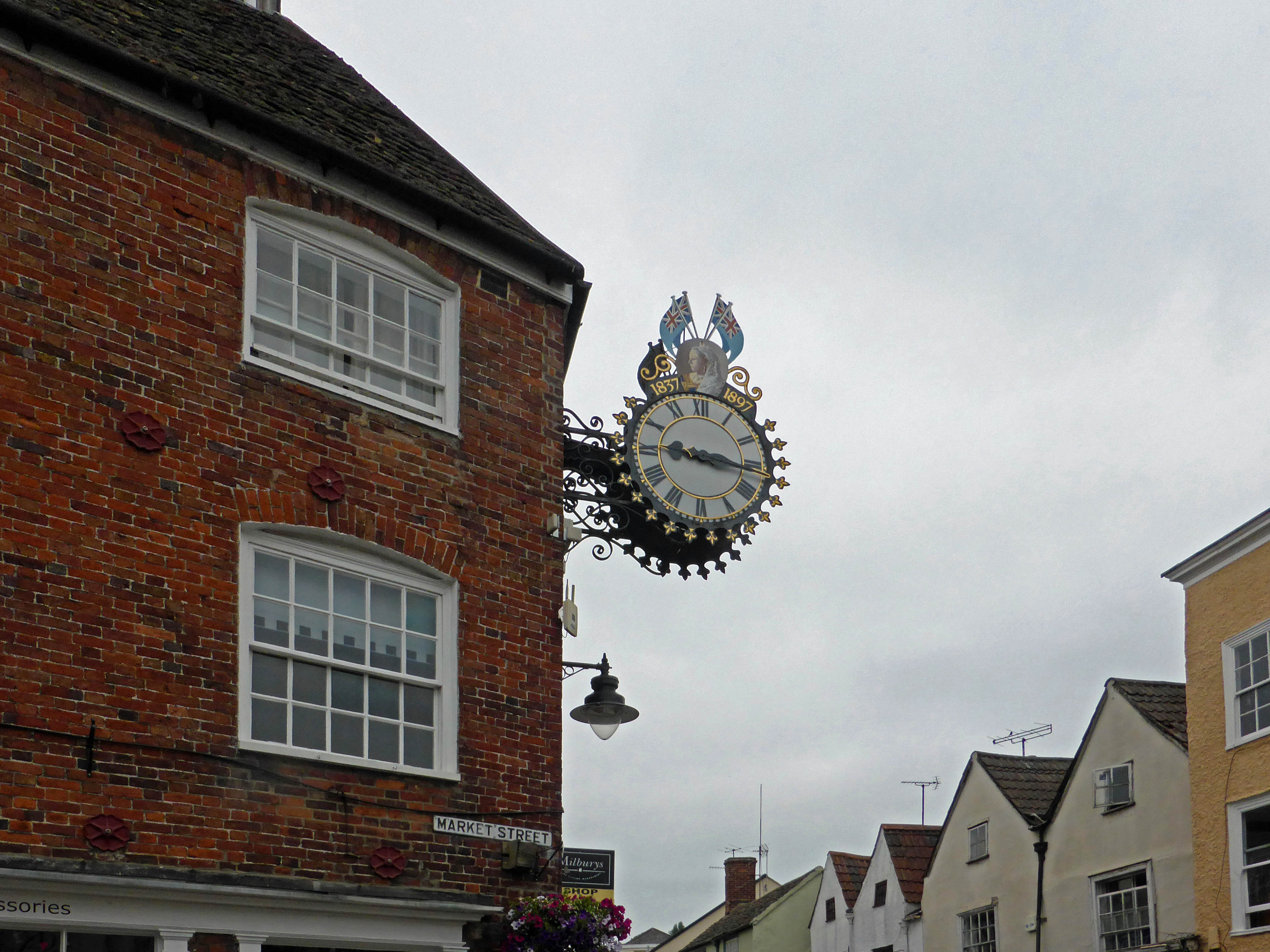
The Tolsey clock commemorates the Diamond Jubilee (60 years) of Queen Victoria's reign. The clock says "1837 - 1897". It lies between Market Street and High Street in Wotton-under-Edge, Gloucestershire, England.

== England ==
=== London ===
==== Harlesden ====
Harlesden is a district in the London Borough of Brent. A Jubilee Clock was erected there in 1888 to commemorate Queen Victoria's Jubilee the year prior. It was made out of cast iron and cost £299. The clock was renovated in 1997.

==== Mitcham ====
Mitcham is an area in the London Borough of Merton. The Jubilee Clock Tower in Mitcham, also known as the Mitcham Clock Tower, is a historic landmark located on Fair Green. It was unveiled to commemorate the Diamond Jubilee of Queen Victoria in 1897. The clock tower was financed by public subscription and built on the site of the old village pump. The clock tower features four gas lamps that originally lit the clock faces. Over the years, the position of the clock tower has been altered to allow for the redevelopment of Fair Green

==== Islington ====
Islington is a district in the London Borough of Islington. The Islington Jubilee Clock Tower, also known as the Highbury Clock Tower, is a historic landmark and Grade II listed building located on the corner of Highbury Hill and Church Path in Islington, London. It was built in 1897 to commemorate the Diamond Jubilee of Queen Victoria. The clock tower was donated by Alfred Hutchinson to the Islington Vestry.

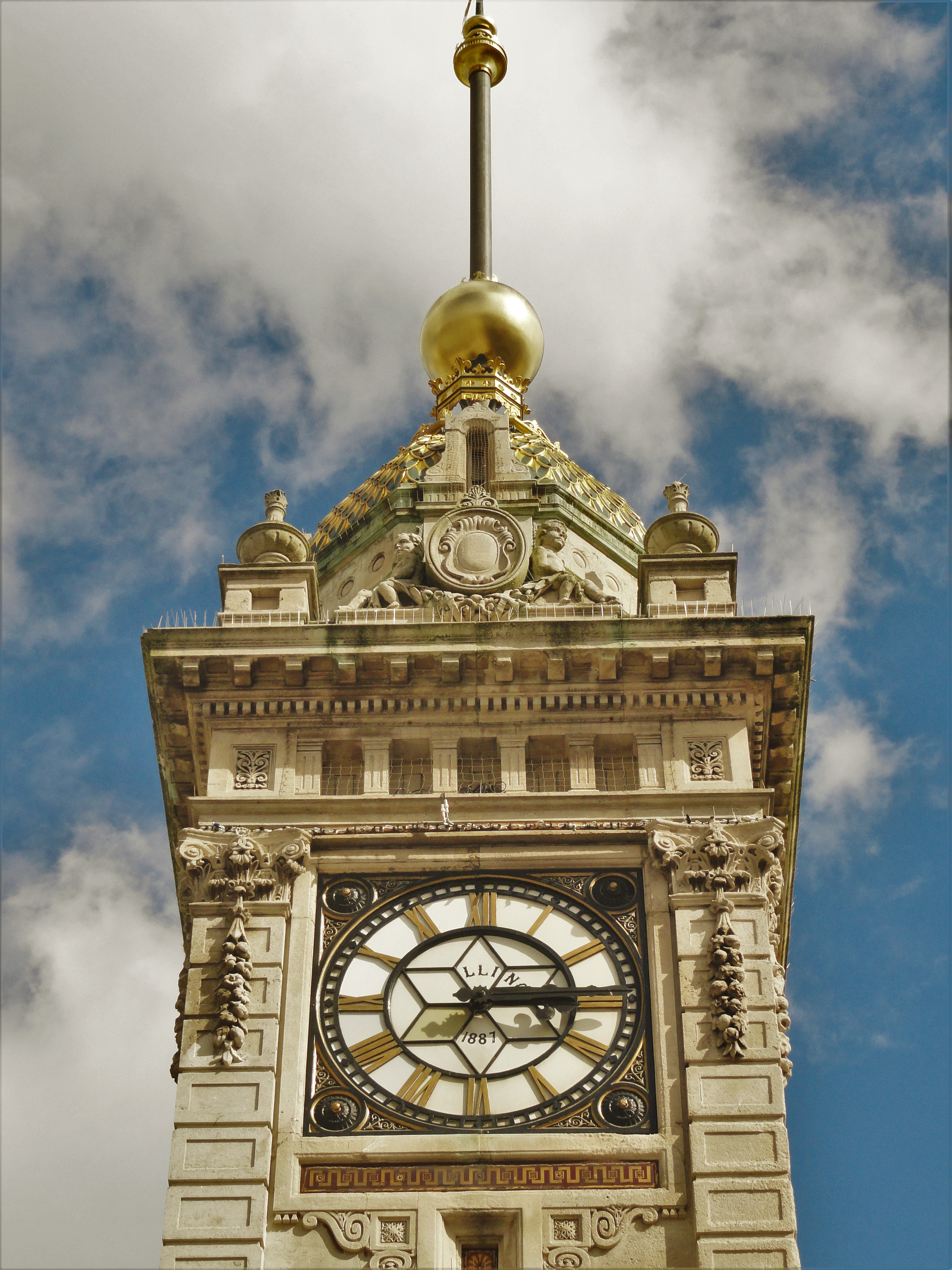
Close up view of Clock Tower, Brighton, showing the time ball in down descent

=== Brighton ===
The Brighton Clock Tower or Jubilee Clock Tower, located at the junction of West Street and Queens Road, Brighton, England, was built in 1888 to commemorate Queen Victoria's Golden Jubilee.

The tower is made of pink granite and limestone, with limestone figures at each corner, and medallion mosaics of Victoria, Albert and the Prince and Princess of Wales.

Above the clock is a gilt copper sphere, a time ball that rises up a mast every hour and falls on the hour. The mechanism was taken out of use for many years because of noise complaints from local residents: it was renewed as part of a renovation of the clock tower and surrounding area in 2002.

=== Cricklade ===
The Cricklade Jubilee clock, is located outside the Vale Hotel, Cricklade at the junction of Calcutt Street and the High Street.

=== Maidenhead ===
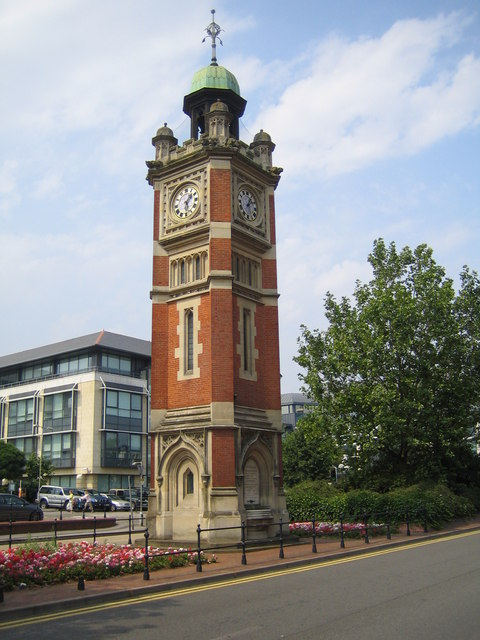
Maidenhead Clock Tower

The Jubilee Clock Tower, located in Maidenhead, Berkshire, England just outside the station in the town centre, was built as part of the nation's celebrations for Queen Victoria's Diamond Jubilee in 1897.

Building started in 1897 using money from public donations. The foundation stone was laid by then-mayor John Truscott on 7 November 1899. The tower was designed by local architect E. J. Shrewsbury, who designed many of the town's churches including St Peter's in Furze Platt plus the Technical Institute on Marlow Road. The clock tower was built by Charles Cox & Son; Charles Cox was the town mayor on several occasions.

The tower is approximately 14 m (45 ft) tall and has four illuminated clock faces each facing the four compass points. A diamond pattern on the clock faces commemorates the clock's function. The clocks were donated by Mr G. A. Battcock; they were made and foxed by Smith of Derby Group.

Red brick is used for most of the construction, typically of the local housing of that time. There is an elaborate pattern of stone work towards the top, just below the bell tower. All the clocks and bells still function.

=== Newmarket ===
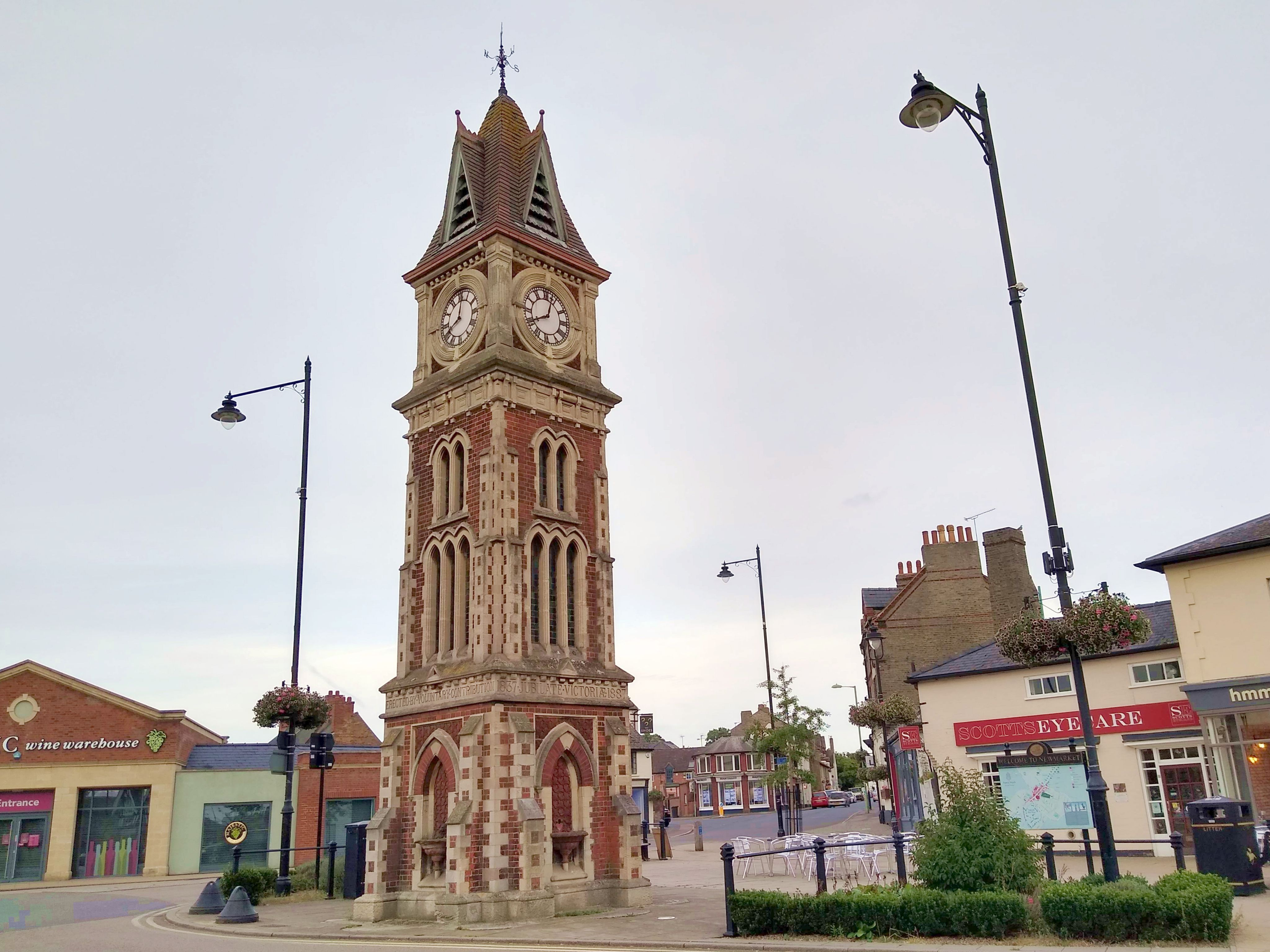
Newmarket Clock Tower

The Newmarket Clock Tower is located at the top of the High Street. Local builder Richard Arber built it to commemorate Queen Victoria's Golden Jubilee of 1887. The tower was paid for by public subscription, but local trainer Charles Blanton donated the clock made by Smith of Derby Group. The clock tower was officially opened in 1890. It takes 115 turns to fully wind the clock every week.

=== Thornford ===
In 1897 the village of Thornford decided to commemorate Queen Victoria's Diamond Jubilee by erecting a Jubilee tower clock and incorporating a water tap at its base.

The clock tower was completed by Christmas 1898 and a clock made by Richard Robert Purchase, jeweller and watchmaker of Yeovil, was installed. A weather vane made by local blacksmith Albert Gabe was accepted by the Parish Council to complete the monument, and a Lime tree and privet hedge were planted behind the tower and iron railings with kissing gates erected at the front.

=== Weymouth ===
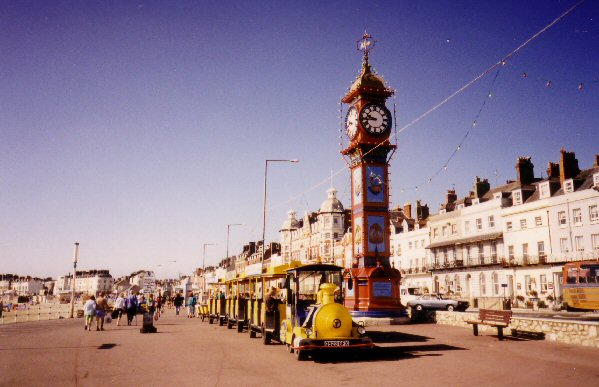
Weymouth's Jubilee Clock

Erected in 1887 to mark the 50th year of Queen Victoria's reign the Jubilee Clock was originally positioned on a stone base on Weymouth sands, but in the 1920s the Esplanade was built around it to protect the sands from the encroachment of shingle from the eastern end of the beach. It is a Grade II listed building and is the focal point of Weymouth's New Year's Eve celebrations.

== Isle of Man ==
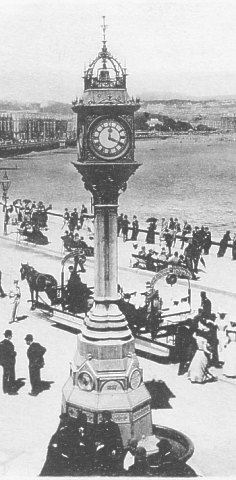
Isle of Man Jubilee Clock c.1900

A Jubilee Clock is located in the Isle of Man capital of Douglas. It was donated by G.W. Dumbell in 1887 as a commemoration of the Golden Jubilee of Queen Victoria's reign. It is located at the foot of Victoria Street and Loch Promenade.

Manufactured by Walter Macfarlane & Co. at the Saracen Works, Glasgow. There is one other known clock using the same castings, the Hastings Clock erected at Rotherham, England in 1912.

As can be seen from this c. 1900 photo, it originally had a horse trough and, hidden by one of those standing at the base, a drinking fountain, above which is a plaque of Queen Victoria.

The 8-day clock mechanism used a weight descending in the column — originally the four clock faces were lit by small gas jets. Both mechanisms are now electrified.

== Malaysia ==
=== Penang ===
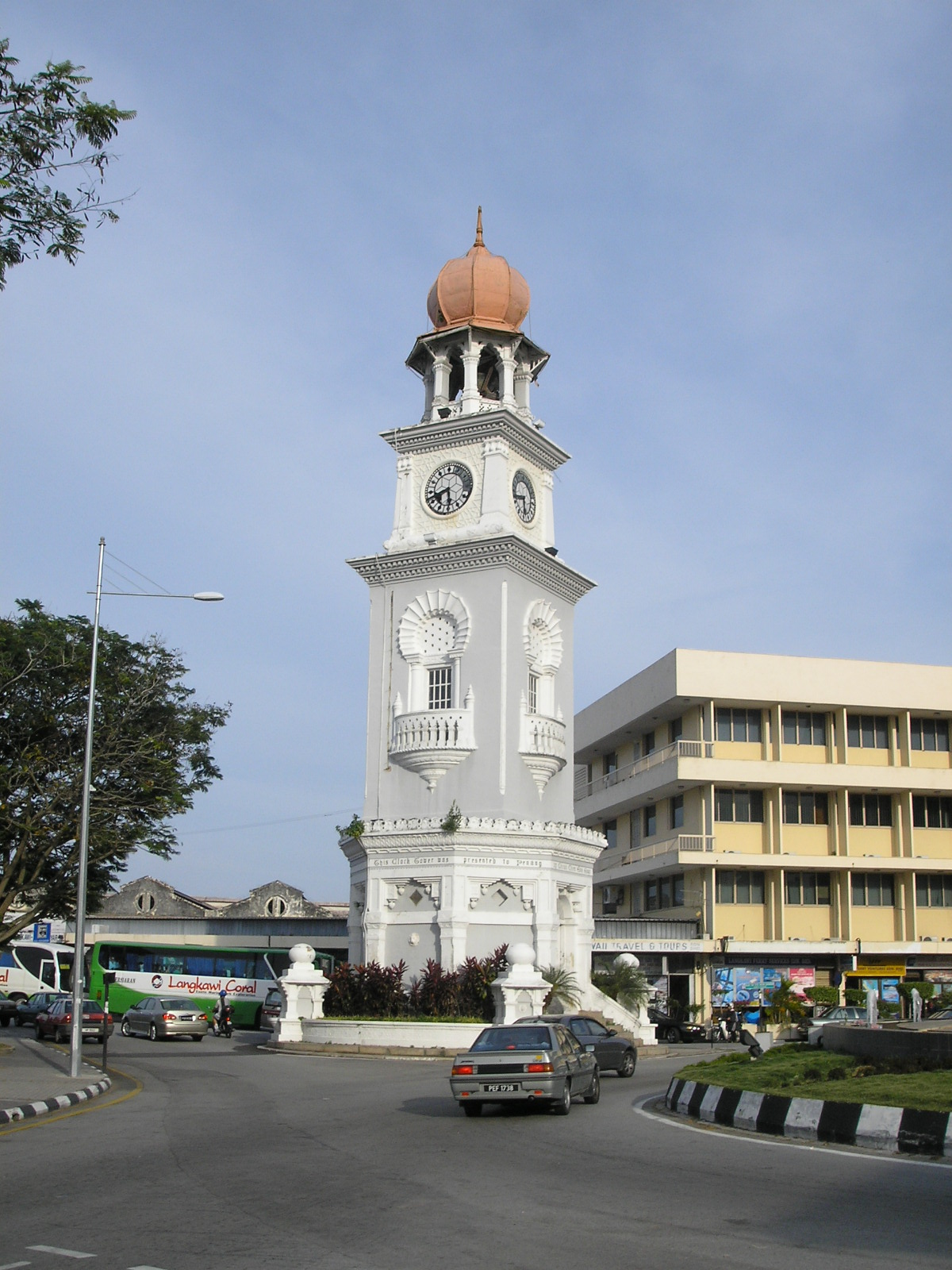
Jubilee Clock Tower in Georgetown, Penang.

To commemorate Queen Victoria's 1897 Diamond Jubilee, a Jubilee Clock Tower was constructed in George Town, Penang (at the time a British Straits Settlement) in the same year at junction of Lebuh Light (Light Street) and Lebuh Pantai (Beach Street). Built in a Moorish style, the tower is sixty feet tall, one foot for each year of Victoria's reign.

=== Sungai Petani, Kedah ===
The major landmark of Sungai Petani is a clock tower located on the main street, Jalan Ibrahim. The clock tower was built in 1936. It is 12.1 m in height and topped by a dome-shaped structure. The tower was a present from Lim Lean Teng to George V and Queen Mary to commemorate the Silver Jubilee.

== New Zealand ==
The Diamond Jubilee Clock Tower, located in Christchurch, New Zealand at the intersection of Victoria Street and Montreal Street was built to commemorate the Diamond Jubilee of Queen Victoria. It is made of volcanic stone and limestone with ornate wrought iron work with coloured glass around part of the tower with four faces. The tower also has two white marble plaques and one bronze plaque set on stone work above arches.
