= Jubilee Clock Tower =

Clock tower in George Town, Penang, Malaysia

Queen Victoria Memorial Clock Tower
- Menara Jam Peringatan Victoria (Malay) 旧关仔角钟楼 (Chinese) ராணி விக்டோரியா நினைவு மணிக்கூண்டு (Tamil)
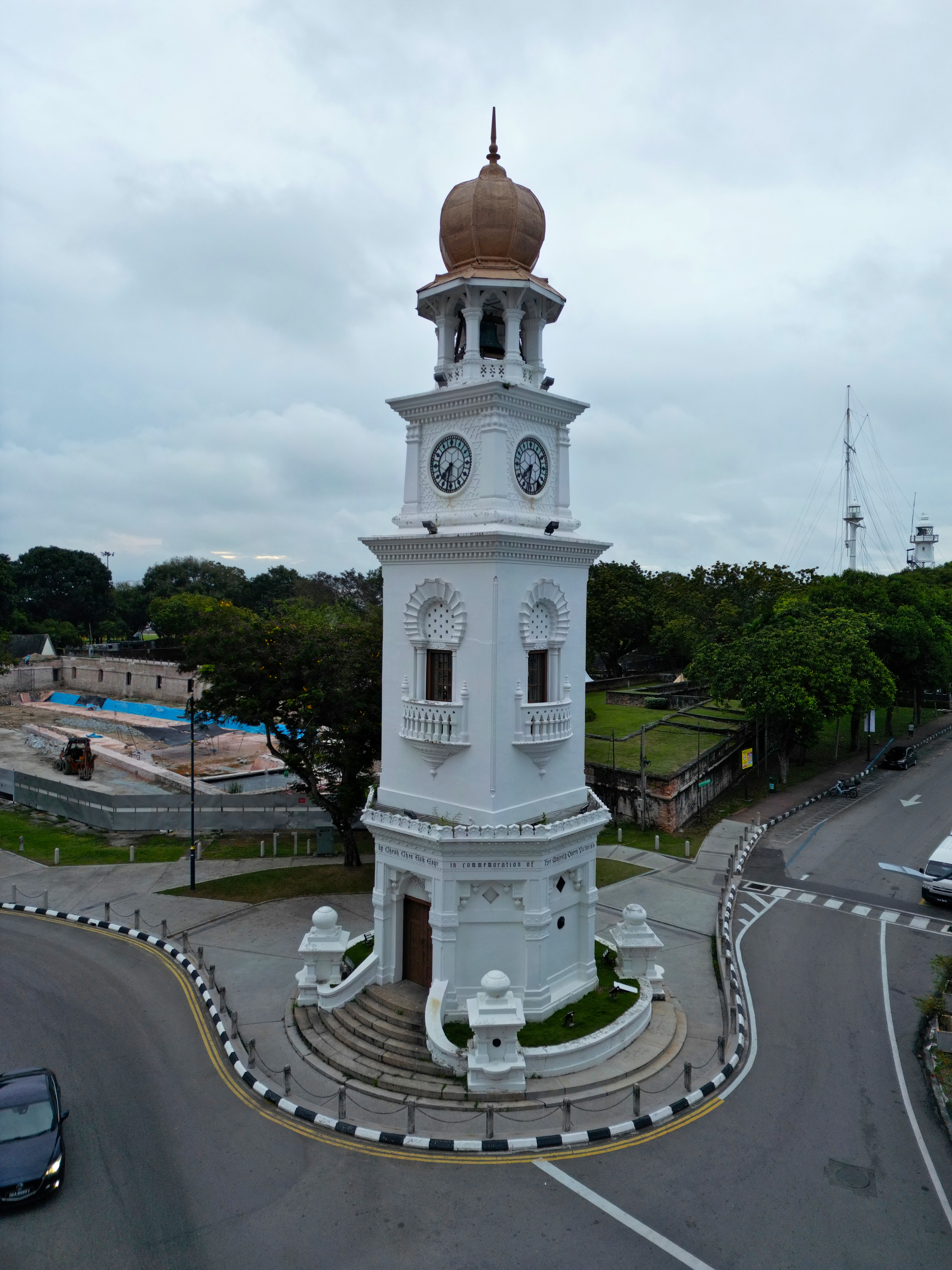
- Interactive map of Queen Victoria Memorial Clock Tower
- Location: George Town, Penang, Malaysia
- Coordinates: 5°25′9.8214″N 100°20′39.0984″E
- Designer: Robert Peirce
- Type: Jubilee clock tower
- Height: 97 ft (30 m)
- Beginning date: 1900
- Completion date: 1902
- Dedicated to: Queen Victoria

UNESCO World Heritage Site
- Type: Cultural
- Criteria: ii, iii, iv
- Designated: 2008 (32nd session)
- Part of: George Town UNESCO Core Zone
- Reference no.: 1223
- Region: Asia-Pacific

The Queen Victoria Memorial Clock Tower, also known as the Jubilee Clock Tower, is an Indo-Saracenic style clock tower within George Town in the Malaysian state of Penang. Located at the intersection of Light Street and Beach Street, it was built to commemorate the Diamond Jubilee of Queen Victoria.

== History ==
=== Background ===
In 1821, a small watering reservoir was first completed at this site. Fed by an aqueduct commencing in the Penang Botanic Gardens, water was then supplied to shipping via a timber jetty projecting out into the bay. The building of a clock tower at Weld Quay was planned during the 100th anniversary of the East India Company's settlement in Penang, but it ultimately came to nothing.

When the Diamond Jubilee of Queen Victoria was drawing close in 1897, the municipal government of Penang had formed a committee to discuss plans for memorialising the monarch. The Chinese business magnate Cheah Chen Eok had offered to build a memorial clock tower for the occasion. His offer was taken and he became the sole contributor of the memorial, pledging a total of 30,000 British Trade Dollars towards its construction.

=== Design competitions and construction ===
A design competition for the clock tower was launched by the municipality in July 1897, with a first prize of $150 and $50 for second. Robert Peirce, the municipal engineer won the first prize while the second prize was taken by Swan & Maclaren. After the committee had decided that all of the competitors needed to modify their designs, the first competition was scrapped to prevent unfairness towards competitors that did not won any prizes, although the winners still got to keep theirs. The competition was relaunched in January 1898, with Robert Peirce winning first prize again and the Penang Foundry Company taking second.

After much deliberation, the site for the clock tower was chosen at a land between Fort Road, Light Street and the moat of Fort Cornwallis in 1900. At that point, the construction costs had greatly risen so Cheah had to pledge an additional $5,000 to cover for it. Construction of the clock tower was commenced in July 1900 and completed 2 years later. An opening ceremony was held on 23 July 1902, officiated by Cheah Chen Eok, James Wilson Hallifax, the President of the Municipal Commissioners of Penang and James Kortright Birch, the Acting Resident Counsillor of Penang. In the ceremony Cheah entrusted the key of the clock tower over to Hallifax. The clock was then set going by Birch's wife.

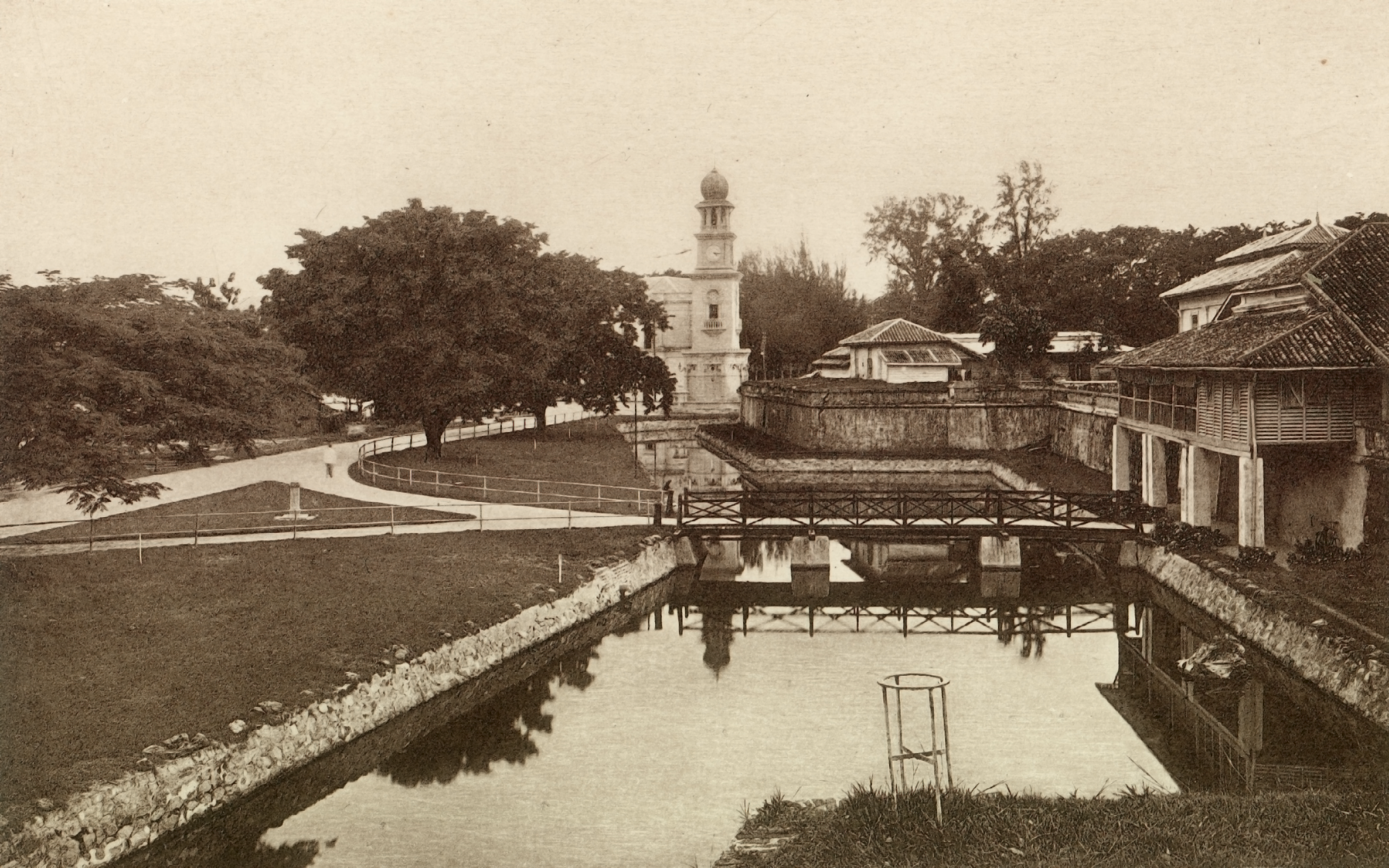
The clock tower visible in the background in around 1910.

=== World War II ===
The clock tower was damaged by Japanese bombings during the Malayan campaign. This, combined with Allied bombings of the area had caused the tower to lean slightly. After the Japanese Occupation, the clock and chimes were repaired in 1946.

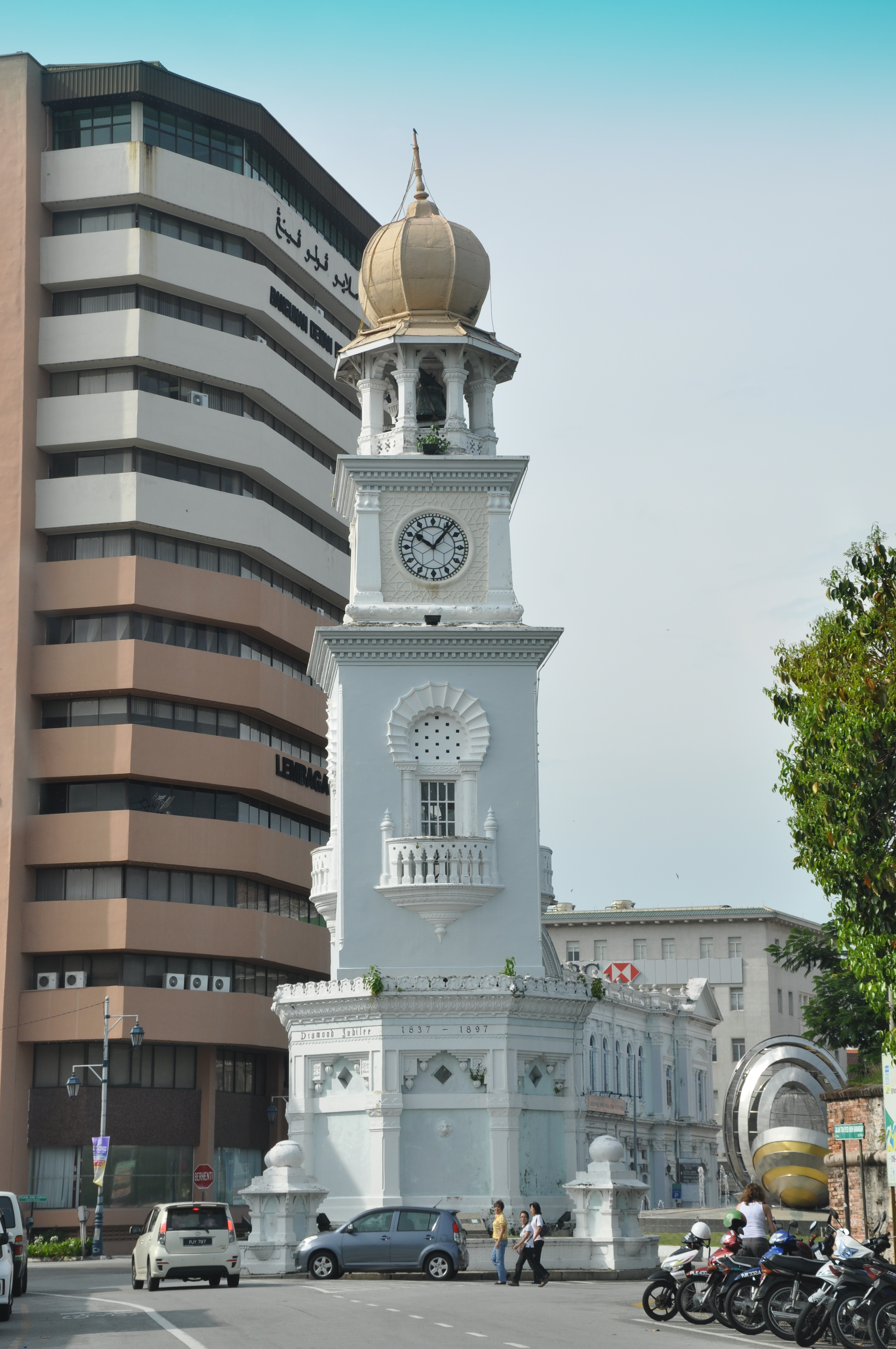
The clock tower could be seen leaning slightly.

=== Present ===
The clock tower was restored as part of the North Seafront Masterplan at the cost of RM150,000, which were fully funded by the Penang Island City Council. Restoration works began in August 2019 and finished in December 2020.

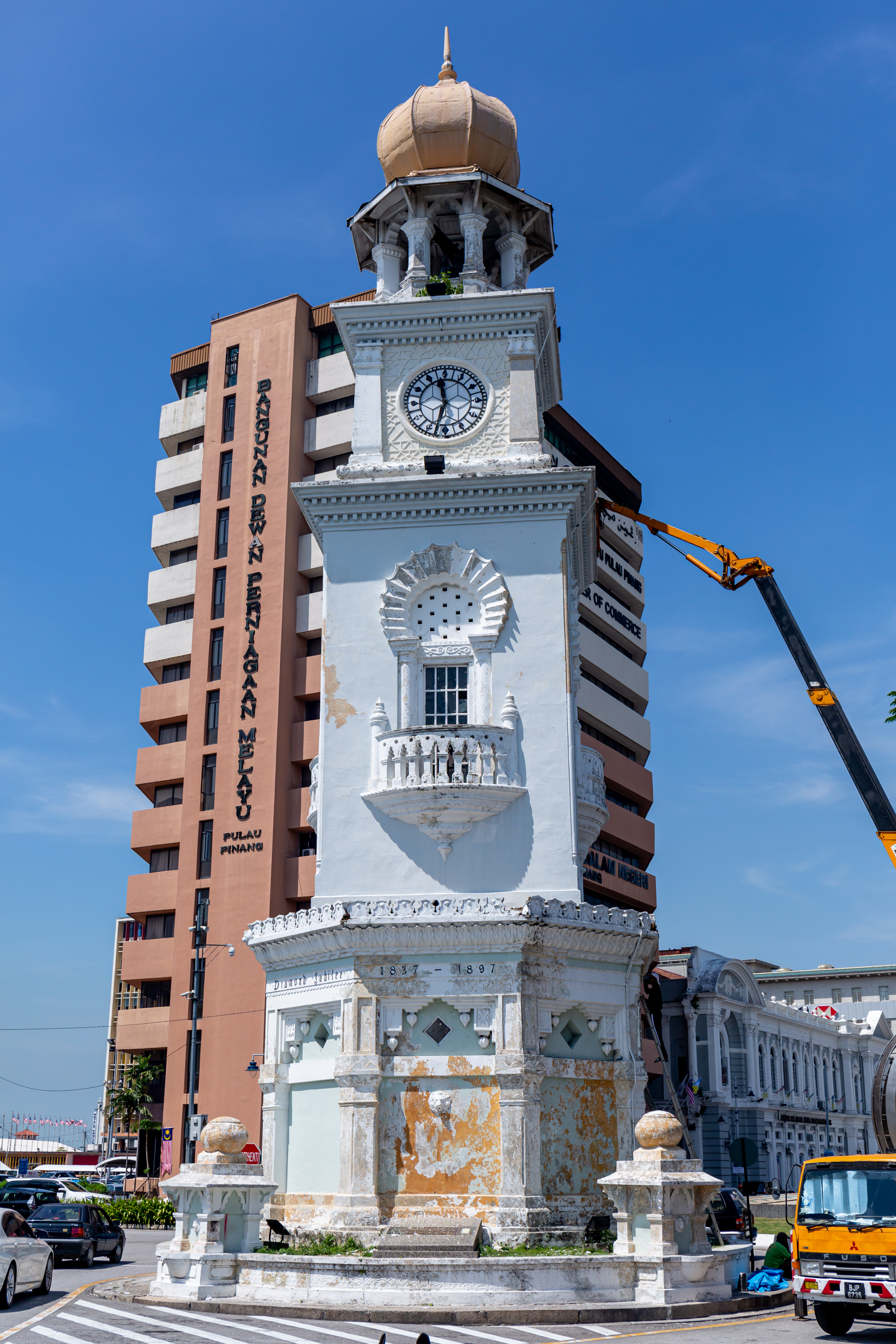
The clock tower undergoing restoration in 2019.

== Architecture ==
The tower was designed by Robert Peirce, the municipal engineer of Penang, and its construction was carried out by Barnett & Stark, with Lee Ah Kong as contractor. The general style of the tower is Indo-Saracenic.

The tower is 60 feet (183 metres) high from the ground to the centre of the clock and 97 feet (30 metres) to the top of the cupola. Each of the 60 feet represents the years of Queen Victoria's reign until her Diamond Jubilee. The ground floor is 5 feet (1.5 metres) above road level and could be entered by a flight of broaded steps. The entrance door is octagonal with carved and moulded cornices at each angle. In each face of the tower is a small lion's head that could discharge water into a basin below, and at about the floor level are similar small heads that could fulfill the function for drinking. Around the base of the tower is a circular basin, 28 feet (8.5 metres) in diameter, with a drinking trough. At four equidistant points of the basin are square shafts with recessed panels.

Around the top of the tower's octagonal portions below the base of the moulded cornices are the following inscription: "This Clock Tower was presented to Penang by Cheah Chen Eok Esq. in commemoration of Her Majesty Queen Victoria's Diamond Jubilee 1837-1897." There were four ornamental bracket lamps fixed on each face of the octagon.

The clock dials are placed in panels above the cornices which are formed by circular moulded columns. Above the dials is a belfry containing the five bells. The bellfry itself has a cupola roof covered with a sheet of copper. The bells collectively weights 21 tons (21.3 tonnes). The bells chimed the Westminster quarters. The clock was made by Gellett & Johnston of Croydon. It is a 36-hour clock requiring winding every day. The room where the dials of the clock are has four windows of opal glass, and originally were illuminated at night by acetylene. The actual fixing of the clock was done by Ebert of Penang.

=== Materials ===
The clock tower was planned to be built with granite but estimates given by the tenders was too expensive, so bricks and cement were used instead. Most of the materials comprising the tower was found locally, and the work of the tower itself was also locally done. The only portion of the tower which was not the result of local work was the big clock in the tower, which had to be brought from Europe.

== See also ==
- List of tourist attractions in Penang
- Jubilee clock
- Clock Tower, Brighton
