= Robert Peirce (engineer) =

British-born civil engineer in Malaysia and Singapore

Robert Peirce (January 1863–1933) was a British-born civil engineer who served as Municipal Engineer in Penang, Malaysia and Singapore.

== Career ==
Peirce was trained as a civil engineer in Manchester, England before moving to the Penang, Straits Settlements in 1891.

He started his career articled to Mr. R. Vawser, M. Inst. C.E., of Manchester but spent several years in Birmingham, where he was engaged as resident engineer for the corporation working on the construction of cable trams. Before arriving in Penang, Peirce was employed as assistant to Pritchard & Co., civil engineers, of London and Birmingham.

=== 1891–1901 : Penang Municipal Engineer ===
Peirce was engineer to the Municipal Commissioners of George Town, Penang from 1891 to 1901. He was rumoured to be in contention for the same role in Singapore in 1895 but remained in Penang till 1901. He made a revealing public comment in 1900 when, urging the Penang Magistrate to deal severely with water wasters, he said average water consumption in Penang "far exceeded that of Singapore". His focus on "water wasters" would continue in Singapore.

He won the competition to design the Jubilee Clock Tower to commemorate the diamond jubilee of Queen Victoria. The gleaming whitewashed tower is topped by a Moorish dome. It has four tiers: the base is octagon-shaped and the following two tiers comprise four distinct sections with elaborate windows, balconies and a working clock on each side. The topmost tier is rounded off with Roman pillars and topped with a golden dome cupola. The six steps leading up to the main entrance denote the number of decades of Queen Victoria's reign.

Jalan Peirce in Penang is named after the Municipal Engineer.

In 1901, on receiving the news that Peirce is likely to leave Penang and accept the post of Municipal Engineer in Singapore, the Pinang Gazette commented on the improvements made and the smoothness of operations in the department and that his departure is "Penang's loss was Singapore's gain".

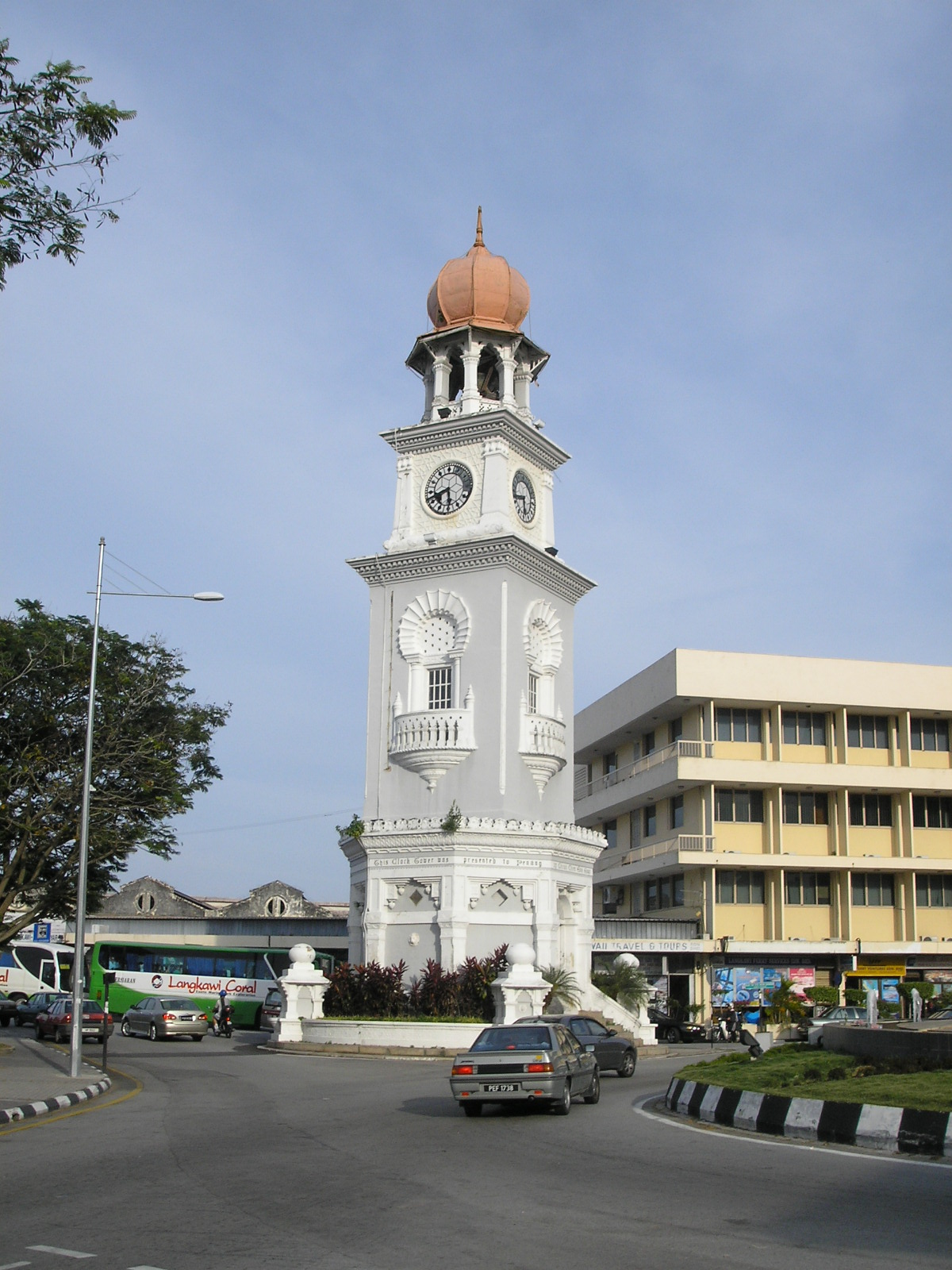
The Jubilee Clock Tower.

=== 1901–1916 : Singapore Municipal Engineer ===
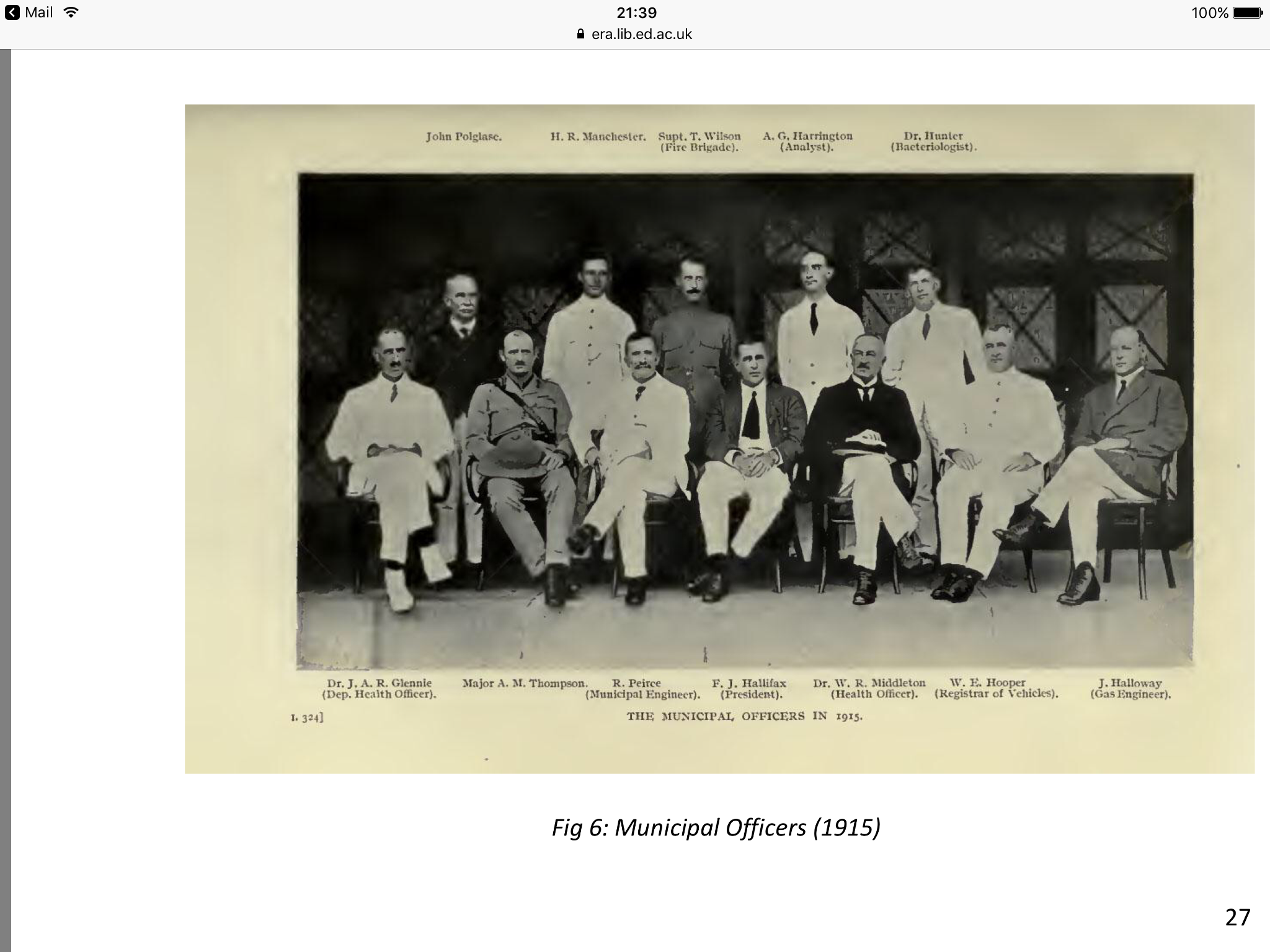
Group photograph

In Singapore, Peirce is best known today for his work on the Kallang River Reservoir, now known as Lower Peirce Reservoir. While construction began in 1902 – a year in which Singapore experienced a serious drought – the scheme was conceived by a previous Municipal Engineer James MacRitchie in the early 1890s. The reservoir was completed in 1910 according to the commemorative plaque and opened in March 1912. The reservoir and its importance to Singapore is comprehensively described in a contemporary newspaper article.

Peirce was warmly praised for his work on water supply: 'Singapore now has one of the finest water supplies in the world, and to get that on a tiny island which has no river much bigger than a ditch must have meant long and earnest study and a fine capacity for making the most of available means' The reservoir was renamed the Peirce Reservoir in 1922 in recognition of Peirce.

In Singapore, Peirce was responsible for the completion of the Pearl's Hill Service Reservoir in 1902, for the completion of the Woodleigh Filters and the Kallang Tunnel Works, and for the construction of numerous roads.

Peirce authored a 1905 report on night soil collection by pail, and disposal at sea, which was approved by the Municipal Commission only to be overturned in favour of a water borne sewage system. In this matter, Peirce showed himself to be conservative and not an early adopter of new technology. At that time a water borne sewage system had been operating for 20 years in Rangoon. The 'Pail' versus 'Sewer' debate is discussed by Brenda Yeoh in Contesting Space in Colonial Singapore. However Peirce demonstrated his confidence in new materials and construction methods with his design and approach to the construction of the Anderson Bridge, Singapore's first steel bridge, in 1910. In this case, certain of the fabrication works was done locally, although the main steel structure was imported from Britain.

In March 1906, Peirce tendered his resignation over a pay dispute. Parts of the media jumped to his defence stating the role of Municipal Engineer in Singapore was "by far the most important of its kind in the Straits Settlements" and the case was "an illustration of the eternal truth that one had to pay the market price [to get the services and counsel of good men]" A proposal by Municipal Commissioners to hike Peirce's pay was criticised by other active local media who decried paying "enormous salaries to high officials, in many cases twice what they would get in private life". Comparisons with other highly paid officials, and a comparison with what his predecessor was earning in private practice, were advanced in support of Pierce's pay increase, but the government refused.

Peirce resigned his position as Municipal Engineer and also his commission as a captain in the Singapore Royal Engineers (Volunteers) in May 1906. When Peirce resigned, there was a reference to the Municipal Commission resigning en masse. However, he was eventually reinstated as Municipal Engineer with a 50% pay increase which he had demanded (to £1,500 p.a). Although it disagreed with the decision on behalf of ratepayers and on the principle that 'no man is indispensable', The Eastern Daily Mail proved a useful and independent check on the Municipal Commission.

Peirce also served on the building committee which was formed to oversee the erection of the Victoria Theatre and Concert Hall, completed in 1905.

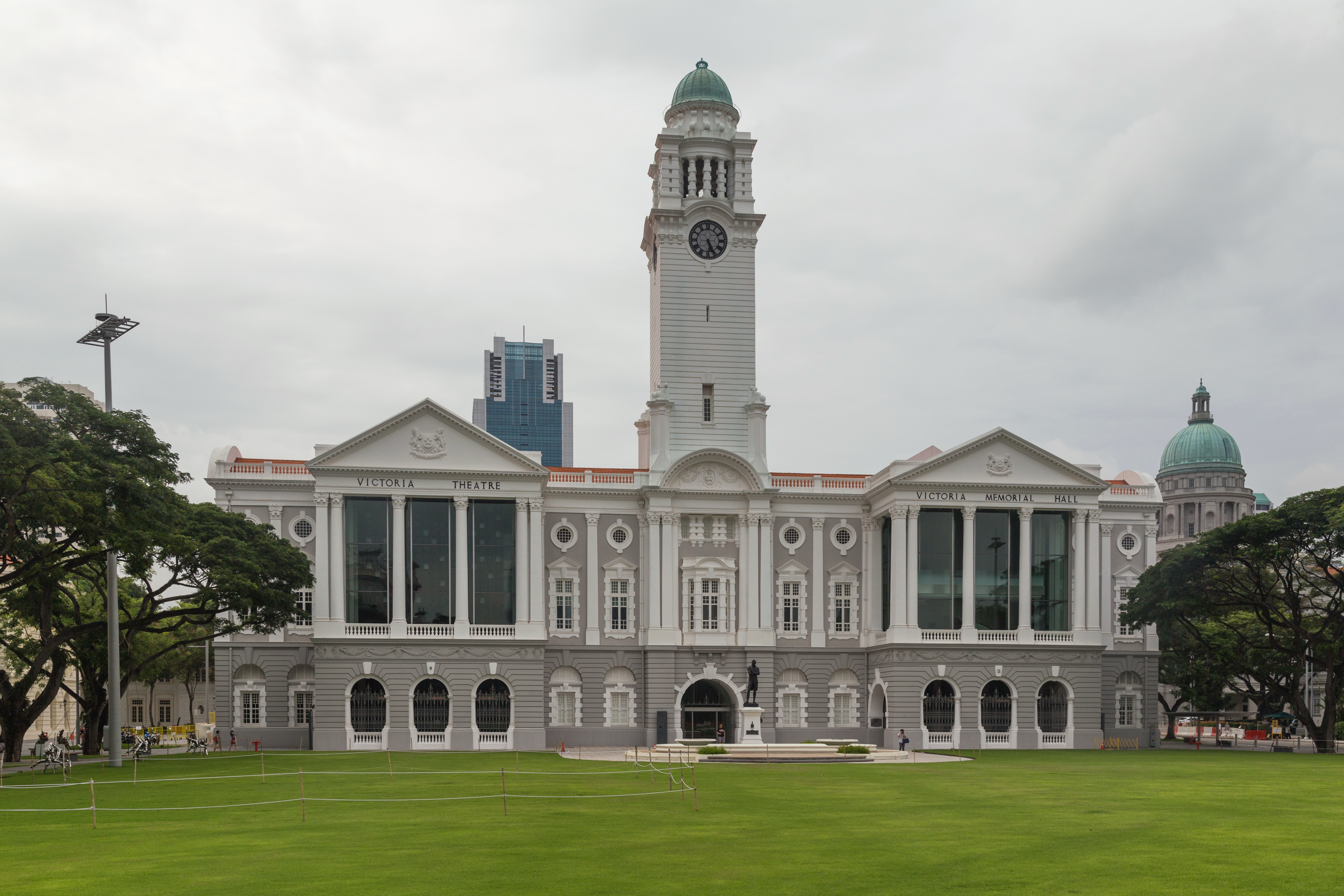
Victoria Concert Hall, Singapore

Over the long term, Peirce was responsible for initiating plans to import water from Johor. In this work, Peirce was ably supported by his deputy Stephen Williams who came to be known as the 'father of the Gunong Pulai water scheme'.

Peirce resigned as Municipal Engineer in Singapore in 1916 due to ill health and returned to England. He went into business as an engineer in London and his firm acted as agent for the Singapore Municipal Commission in London. Williams retired in 1924 and joined Peirce in his business.

In 1923, the Municipal Engineer Col Pearson alleged that there are defective work on the Kallang Reservoir Dam. He suggested the then Municipal engineering staff (Peirce and Williams) may have colluded with the contractor to use sub-standard clay which resulted in leakage in the dam. There was extensive newspaper coverage over 3 days in April 1923 and discussion in the Municipal Commission. Peirce wrote a lengthy letter to defend the work.

== Personal life ==
Peirce was married and had two daughters. One of his daughter died earlier in a motor accident.

Peirce died in 1933 in Gibraltar.

== Legacy ==
Three reservoirs in Singapore are named after influential Municipal Engineers: James MacRitchie, Robert Peirce and David J. Murnane. Due to his many contributions, Peirce was named one of four 'Builders of Modern Singapore' in 1929 along with R. J. Farrer, W. R. C. Middleton, and Alexander Gentle. In addition, Peirce was recognised through the naming of Peirce Road and Peirce Hill, off Holland Road in Singapore. In 1994, within the vicinity of Lower Pierce Reservoir, Pierce Secondary School was established.
