= Highbury Clock Tower =

Historical building in Highbury, North London

- Islington Jubilee Clock Tower
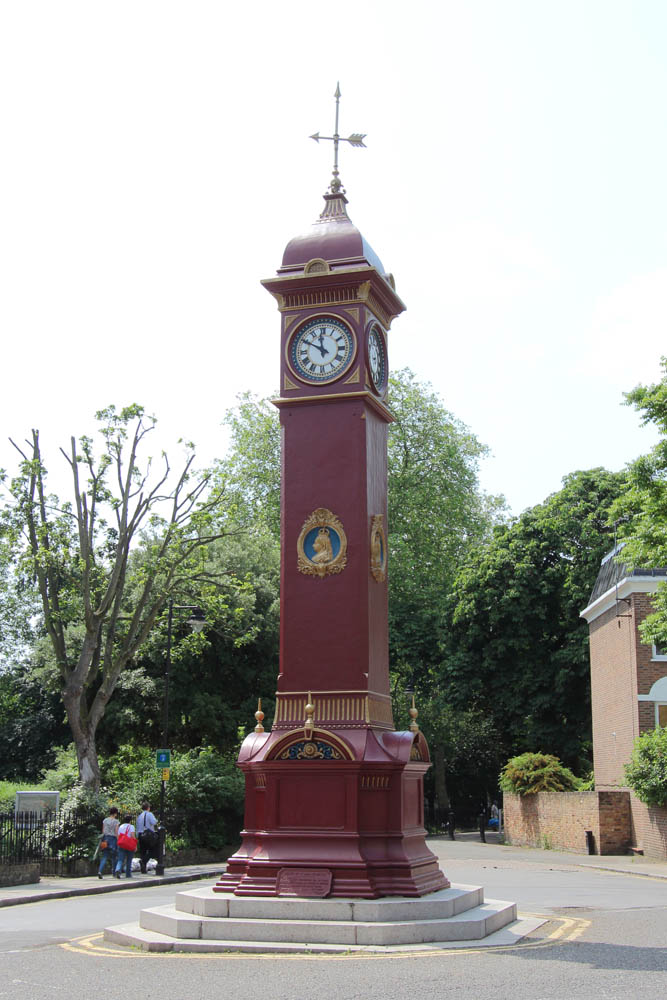

- Location within Islington
- 51.55253°N 0.0991°W
- Type: Clock tower
- Location: Highbury, London, United Kingdom

History
- Built: 1897

Listed Building – Grade II
- Official name: Clock Tower on the Corner of Highbury Hill and Church Path, Highbury Hill
- Designated: 30 September 1994
- Reference no.: 1298033

Highbury Clock Tower, also known as the Islington Jubilee Clock Tower, is a Victorian clock tower in Highbury in the London Borough of Islington, England. It is located at the corner of Highbury Hill and Church Path, near to Christ Church Highbury.

The clock tower was built in 1897 and is a historic landmark and a Grade II listed building. It was presented to the vestry by Mr. Alfred Hutchinson, a public-spirited local resident who lived nearby, at 62 Highbury Park, to commemorate the Diamond Jubilee of Queen Victoria in 1897. In 1910, Mr. Hutchinson was himself still arranging to keep the clock in repair.

The octagonal base is of pink polished granite. The tower is of cast iron, and square in plan. The main column is fluted at the base with low relief portraits of Queen Victoria in wreathed roundels half way up. The four clock faces are surmounted by an ogee top with spike finial. New dials were fitted in 1959.

In 2025, it was announced that the clock tower was to be removed temporarily for full restoration and refurbishment, expected to take about 14 weeks. The clock was removed in July 2026, and London Borough of Islington announced that the tower would be reinstalled in March 2027 in its original colour scheme.
