= NEWater =

Brand of reclaimed wastewater

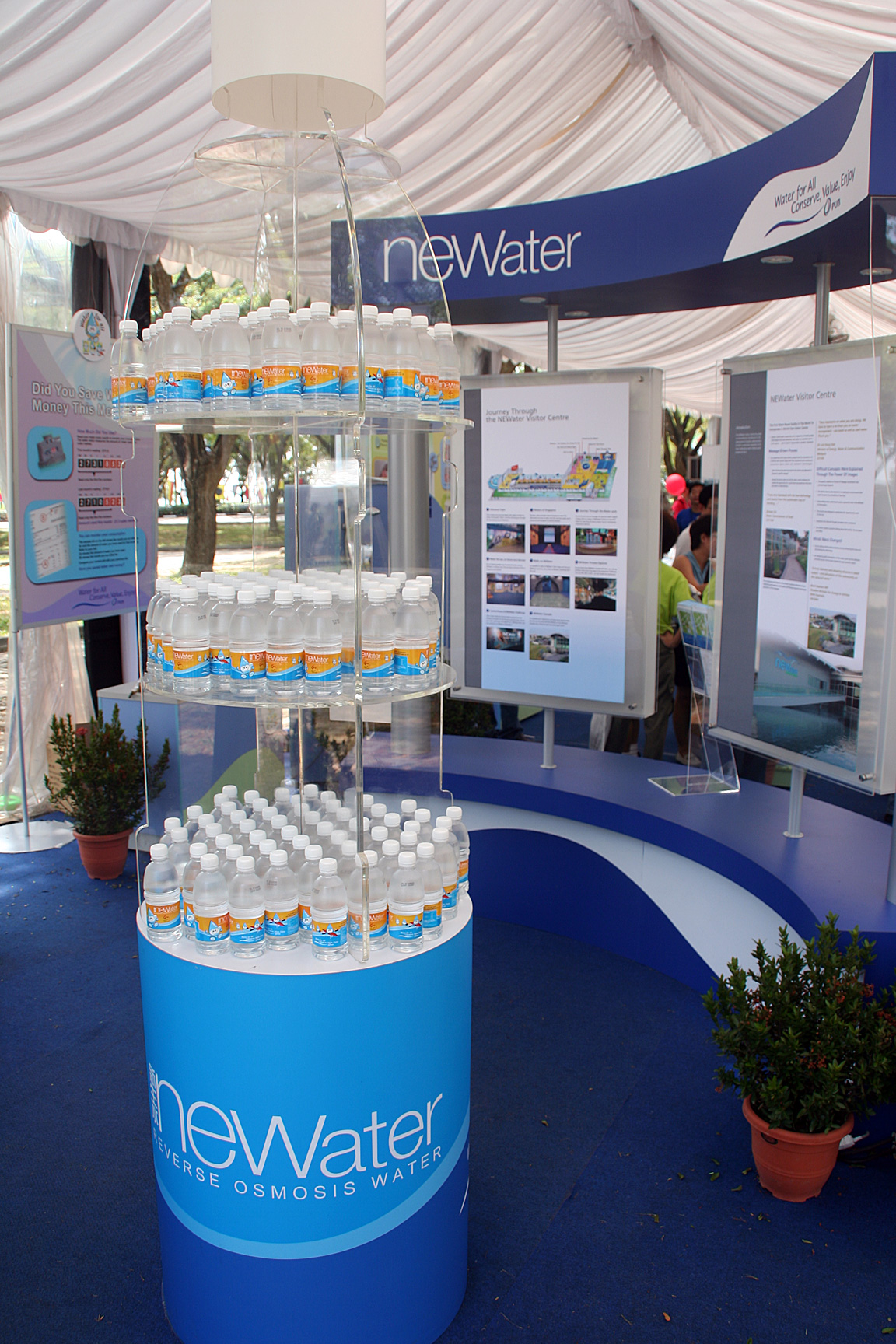
Bottles of NEWater for distribution during the National Day Parade (NDP) celebrations of 2005 at Marina South

NEWater is the brand name given to highly treated reclaimed water produced by Singapore's Public Utilities Board (PUB). NEWater is produced by further purifying conventionally treated wastewater through microfiltration, reverse osmosis and ultraviolet radiation. The water is of potable quality and can be added to drinking water supply reservoirs, where it is withdrawn and treated again in conventional water treatment plants before being distributed to consumers.

NEWater exceeds the drinking water standards set by the World Health Organization (WHO) and the United States Environmental Protection Agency (USEPA). However, most NEWater is currently used for non-drinking purposes, mostly by industries that require high-purity, ultra-clean water in production, such as water fabrication and power generation plants.

== History ==
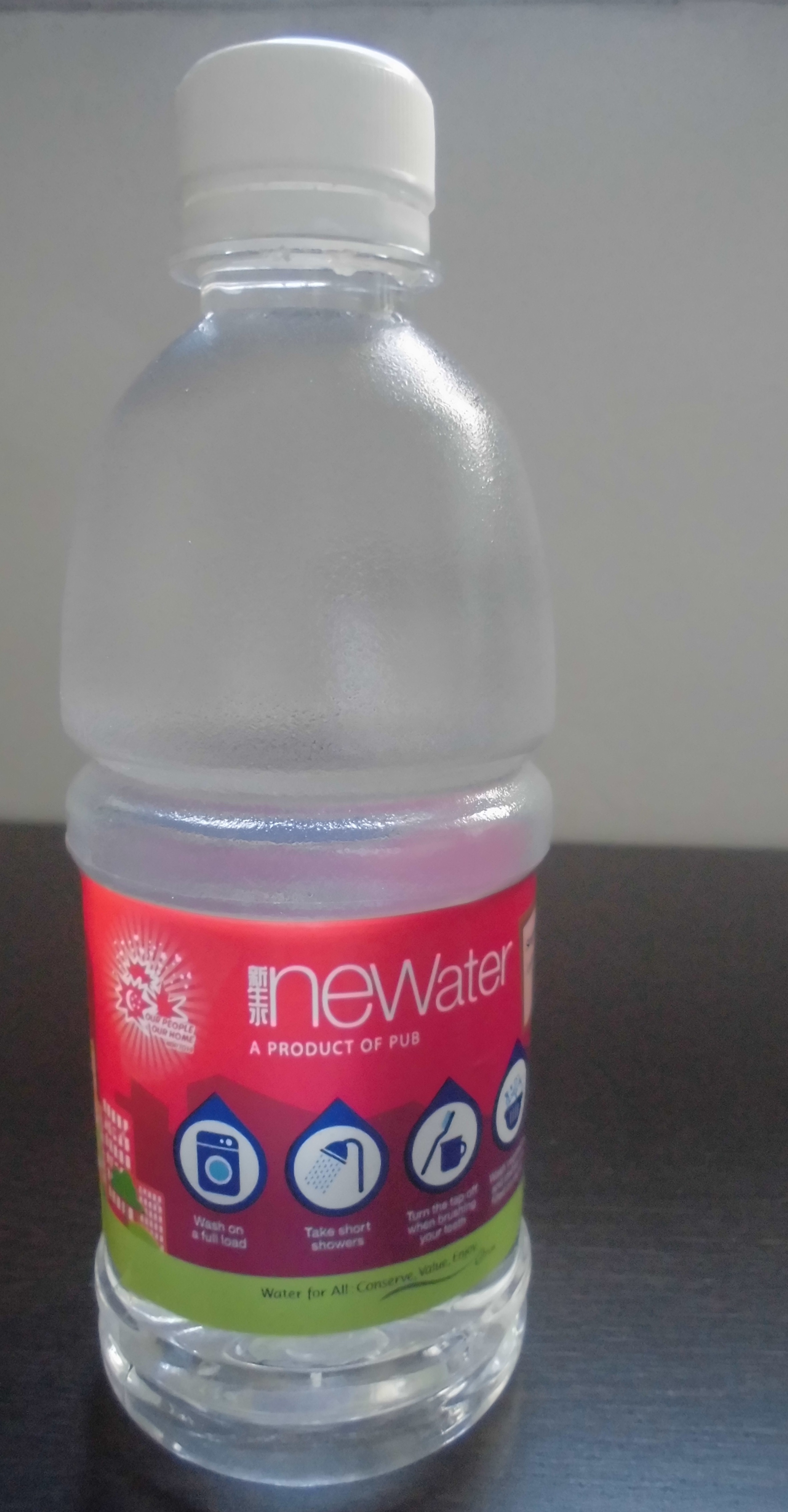
Bottle of NEWater that was given out during NDP 2014.

Singapore considered water recycling to complement its limited fresh water supply starting in the 1970s. A Master Plan drafted in 1972 identified water reclamation and desalination as alternatives to reduce and eventually eliminate dependence on imported water from neighbouring Malaysia. Subsequently, a pre-NEWater experimental water reclamation treatment plant was built in 1974 that was terminated after a year.

In 1998, the PUB and the Ministry of the Environment and Water Resources (MEWR) initiated the Singapore Water Reclamation Study (NEWater Study). The aim was to determine if NEWater was a viable source of raw water for Singapore's needs. Both NEWater and desalination were explored to reduce reliance on water imported from Malaysia. This supply has long been a source of diplomatic friction between the two nations, and the Singaporean government was determined to avoid being vulnerable to foreign resource dependencies. Although the Malaysian government is treaty-bound to supply water to Singapore until 2061, it has no obligation to continue doing so after that date. Consequently, Singapore aims to eliminate this resource dependency well ahead of the 2061 deadline. This dependency is also mutual, as Malaysia also relies on Singapore for treated water. Under the 1962 Water Agreement, Singapore is obligated to provide Johor with treated water, which Singapore supplies at a fraction of the actual treatment cost.

In 2001, PUB initiated efforts to identify non-potable uses of water. NEWater, because of its high quality, became the supply of choice for industry demands. This use provided an outlet for this new water supply without increasing the demand on the limited potable water supply.

The PUB launched NEWater to the public in 2003, with the opening of the first two NEWater plants - the Bedok and Kranji plants - as well as the NEWater Visitor Centre. In anticipation of the potential public concerns over the safety of recycled water, NEWater was carefully implemented. The PUB was cautious in its usage of terms, avoiding terms such as 'wastewater' or 'sewage' that carried a negative connotation. Sewage treatment plants were renamed to 'water reclamation plants' and sewage or wastewater were referred to as 'used water'. This contributed to a positive framing of NEWater, enhancing public acceptance of reused water. In addition, the government extensively engaged the public through exhibitions and advertisements to educate them about NEWater. The NEWater Visitor Centre, which allows people to view the NEWater treatment process, was also opened to enhance visitors' understanding of how NEWater is produced. These public engagement efforts were aimed at correcting any misunderstandings people might have towards recycled water and increasing public support for reused water.

Also, innovative technologies which was promoted by international industries applied on NEWater, such as LG Chem and DuPont in its reverse osmosis technologies.

== Production ==
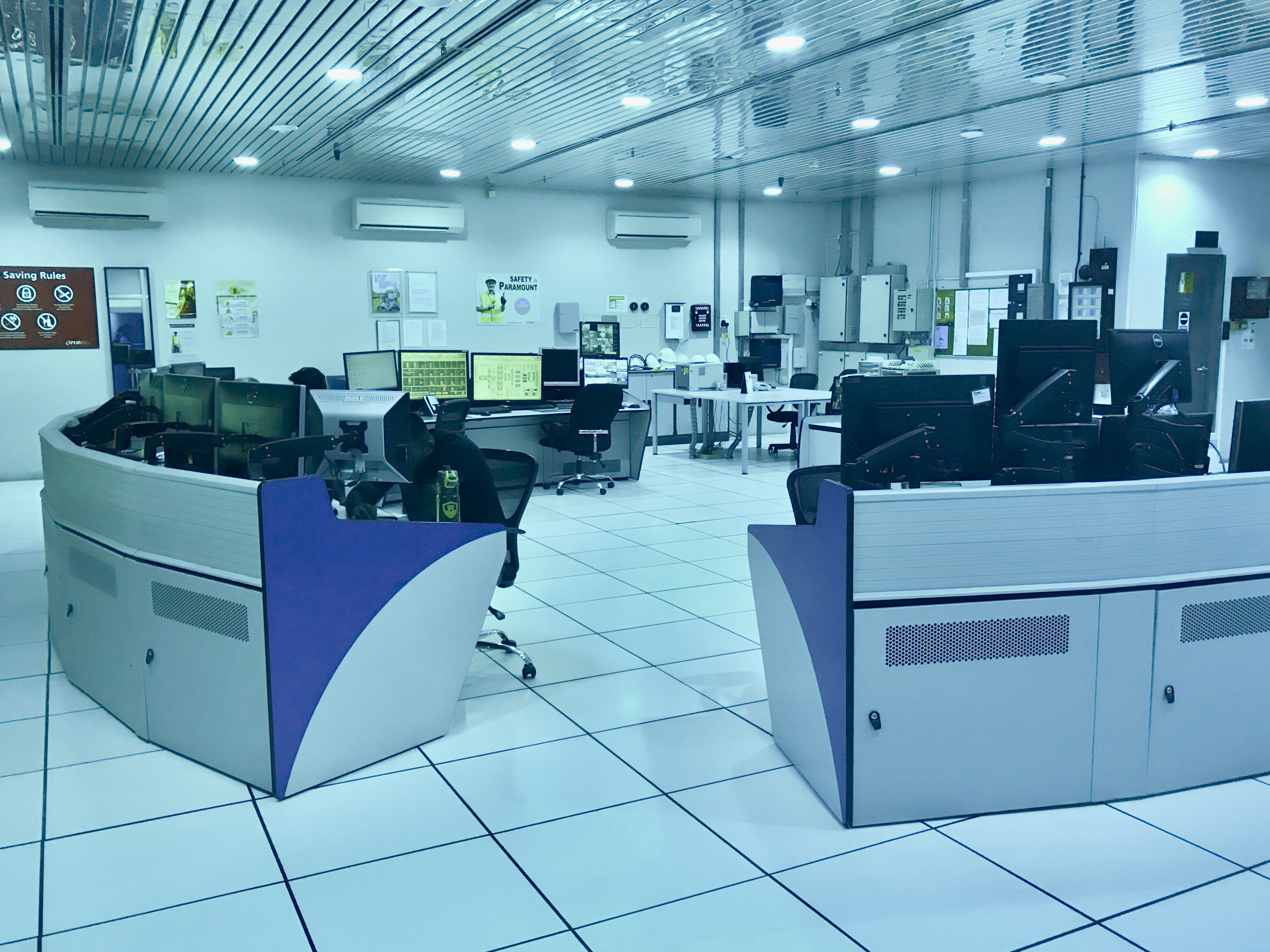
Supervisory Control And Data Acquisition (S.C.A.D.A.) room at a NEWater plant

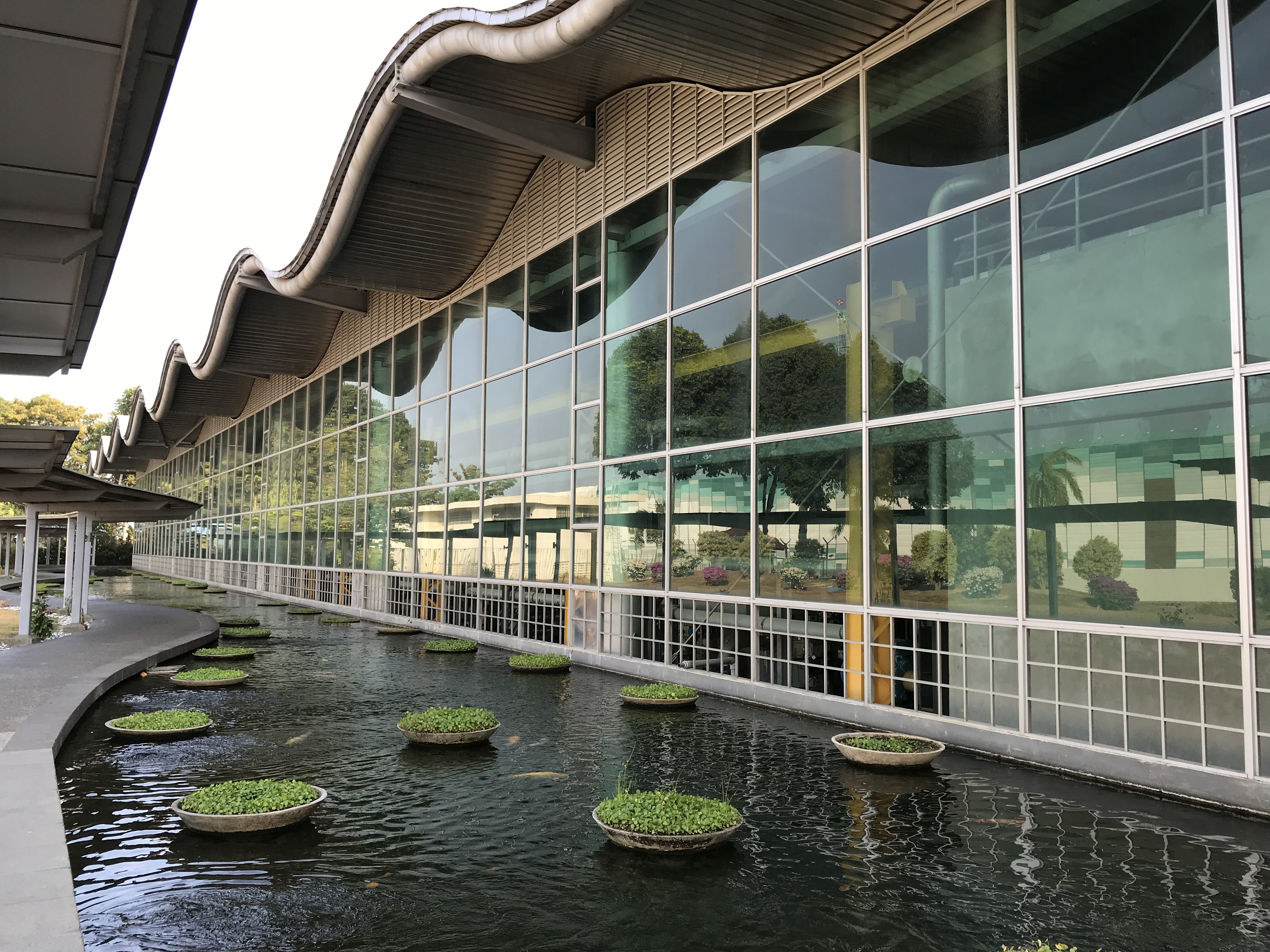
Bedok NEWater Factory

The first NEWater plant was completed in May 2000. Singapore currently has four operational NEWater factories, at Bedok, Kranji, Ulu Pandan and Changi. The Bedok and Kranji factories were commissioned in 2002, the Ulu Pandan plant in March 2007 and the Changi plant in August 2009. A plant at Seletar, commissioned in February 2004, was closed in 2011, as the PUB implemented its plan to centralize the treatment of used water, under the Deep Tunnel Sewerage System. In January 2017, a new NEWater plant was launched at Changi, and is the first plant to be jointly developed by a foreign and local company.

The Bedok and Kranji plants are operated by the PUB, while the Ulu Pandan and Changi plants are under DBOO concessions by Keppel Seghers and Sembcorp Industries.

There is a Visitor Centre in the NEWater factory in Bedok, near the Singapore Expo Tanah Merah MRT station. The visitor centre was awarded the Best Sightseeing/Leisure/Educational Programme at the 20th Tourism Awards 2005 and the IWA Marketing & Communication Award in 2006.

The visitor centre provides multiple free programmes to educate the public regarding the technologies and production of NEWater:

- NEWater Scientist Program – Students take on the role of NEWater Scientists and explore the visitor centre
- Outdoor Classroom – Host fun activities and experiments that help students learn about reverse osmosis and other NEWater processes
- Water Ambassadors – Small workshops that teach uniformed groups (i.e. National Cadet Corps and Scouts Association) skills to be water ambassadors

Plant name	Location	Date of commission	Capacity per day	Operator
Bedok NEWater Factory	Bedok	December 2002	Decommissioned on 31 July 2024	PUB
Changi Water Reclamation Plant	Changi	2017	50 million imperial gallons (230,000 m^{3})	BEWG-UESH
Keppel Seghers NEWater Plant	Toh Tuck	2007	33 million imperial gallons (150,000 m^{3})	Keppel Seghers
Kranji NEWater Factory	Kranji	2002	12 million imperial gallons (55,000 m^{3})	PUB
Seletar NEWater plant	Seletar	2004	Decommissioned in 2011	PUB
Sembcorp NEWater Plant	Changi	2010	50 million imperial gallons (230,000 m^{3})	Sembcorp

=== Procedure ===
NEWater source water comes from effluent of secondary sewage treatment plants. The effluent passes through a multiple-barrier water reclamation process:

- The first stage of the NEWater production process uses microfiltration/ultrafiltration to remove suspended solids, colloidal particles, disease-causing bacteria, some viruses and protozoan cysts. The filtered water after passing through the membrane contains only dissolved salts and organic molecules.
- The second stage of the NEWater production process uses reverse osmosis (RO). A semi-permeable membrane filters out contaminants such as bacteria, viruses, heavy metals, nitrates, chlorides, sulfates, disinfection by-products, aromatic hydrocarbons, and pesticides. NEWater is thus free from viruses and bacteria and contains very low levels of salts and organic matter. At this stage, the water is of potable quality.
- The third stage of the NEWater production process is a safety precaution. UV disinfection is used to ensure that all organisms are inactivated and the purity of the water can be guaranteed. After adding some alkaline chemicals to restore the pH balance, NEWater is ready for use.
NEWater production process

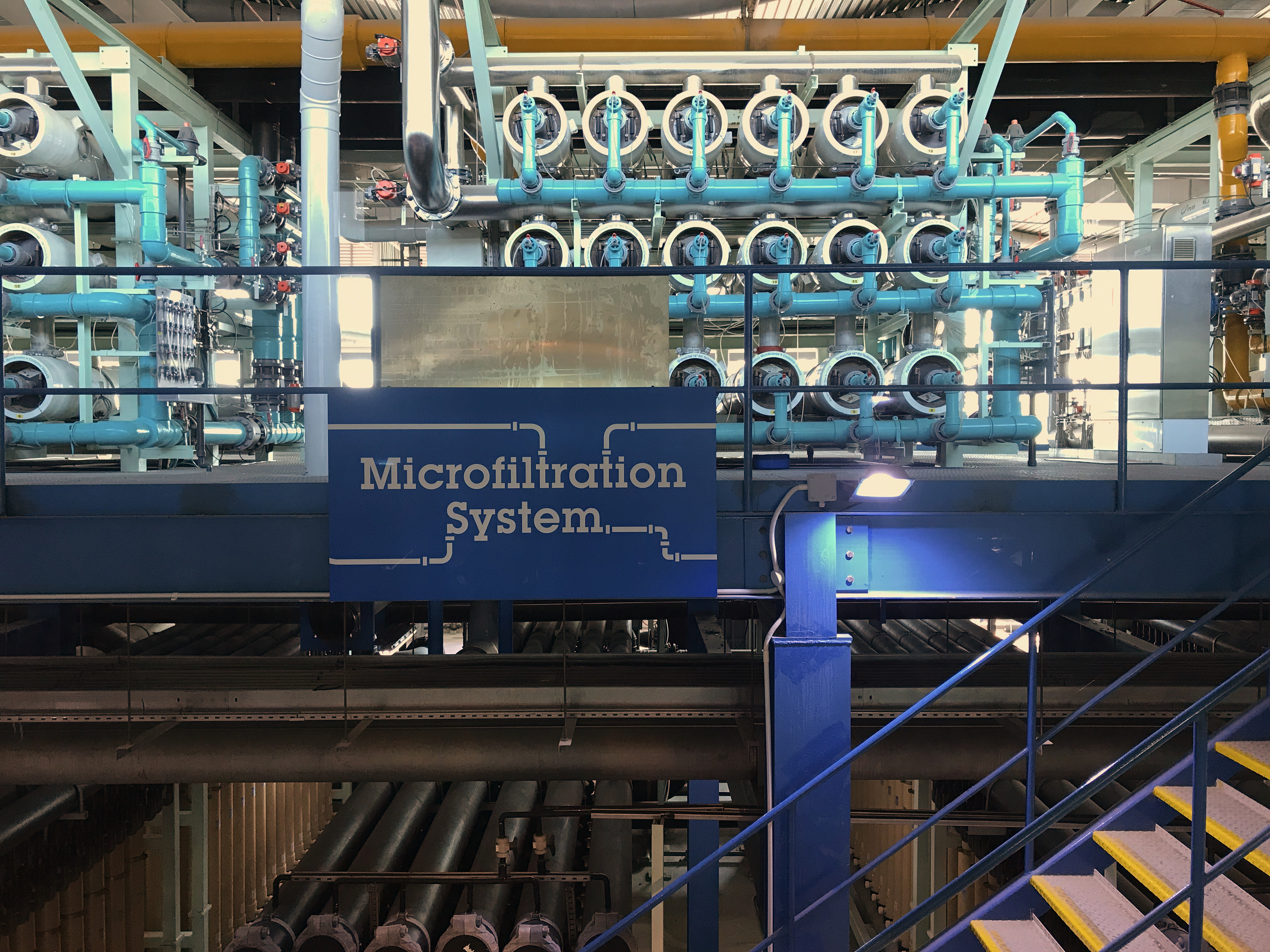
Microfiltration system

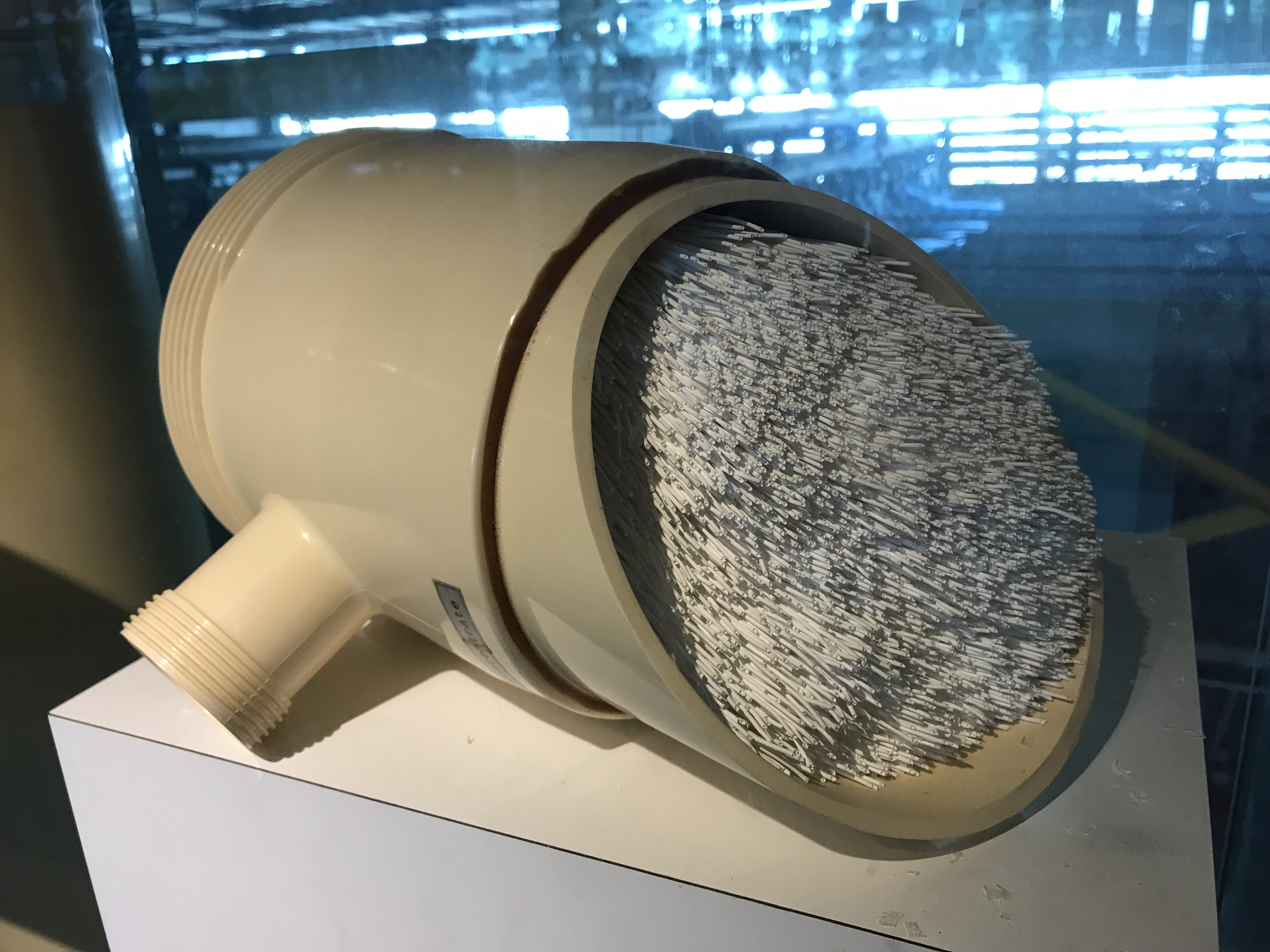
Cutaway of a microfiltration module with hollow fiber membranes

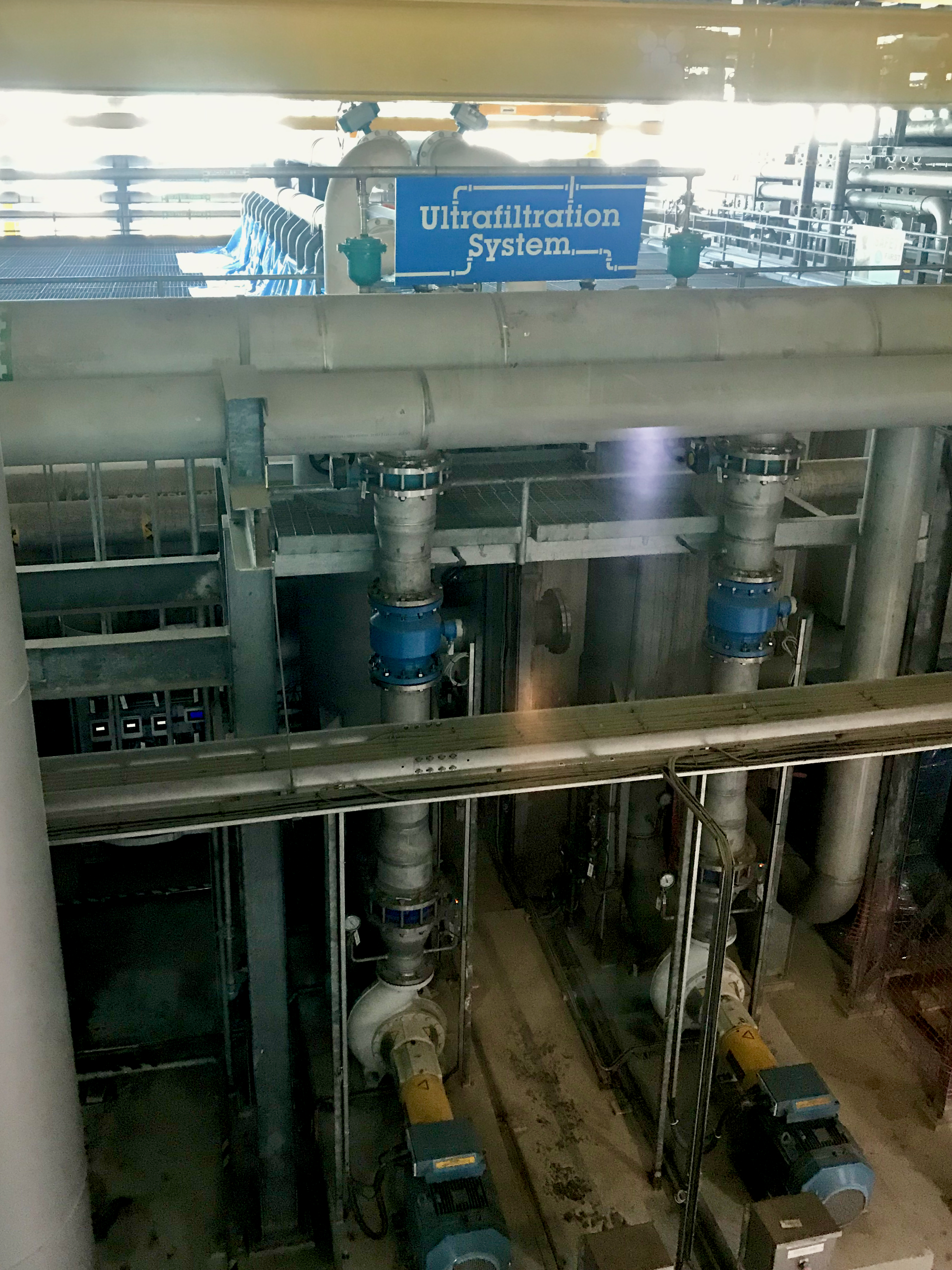
Immersed ultrafiltration with permeate pumps

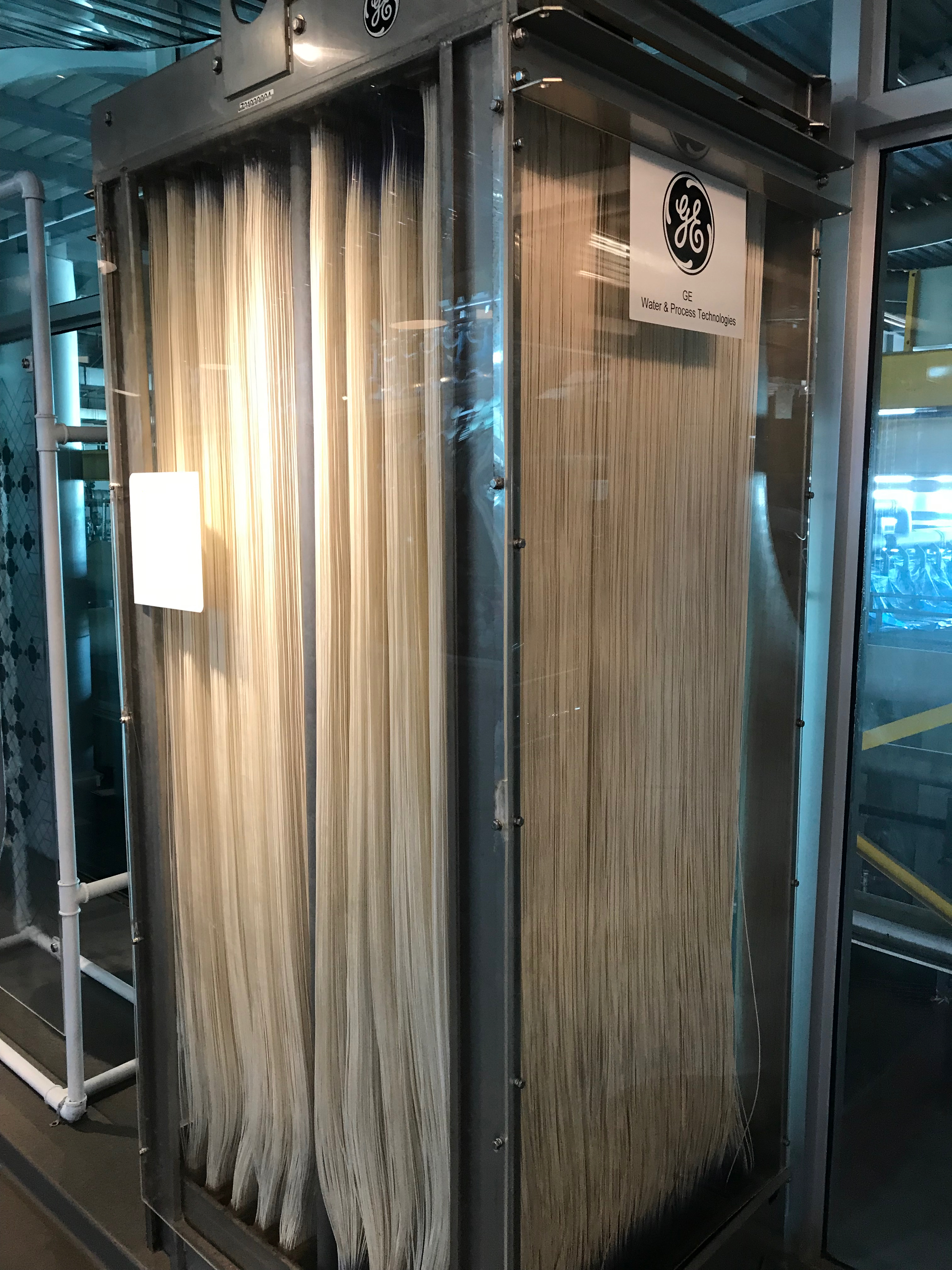
Ultrafiltration membrane module

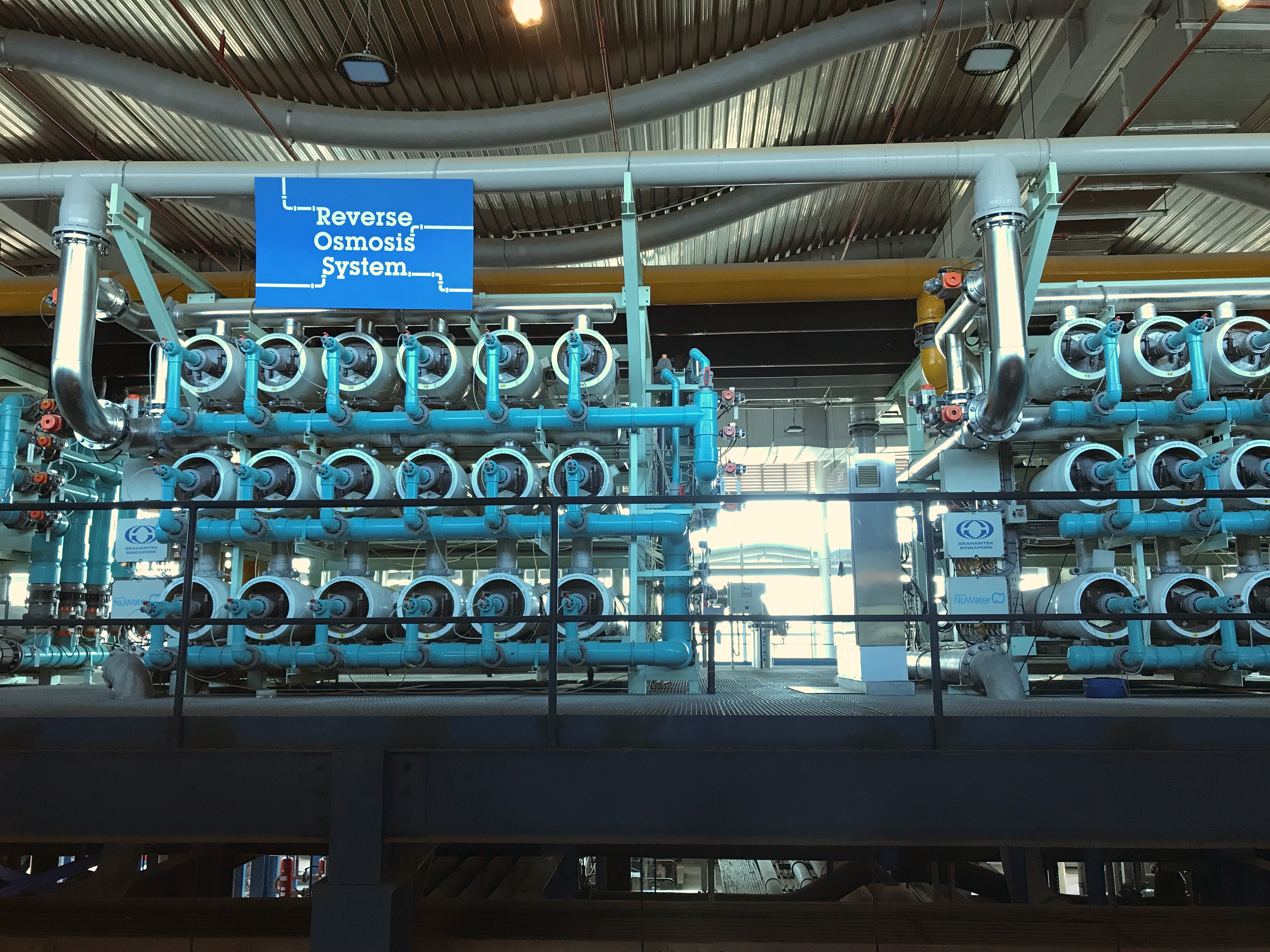
Reverse osmosis system

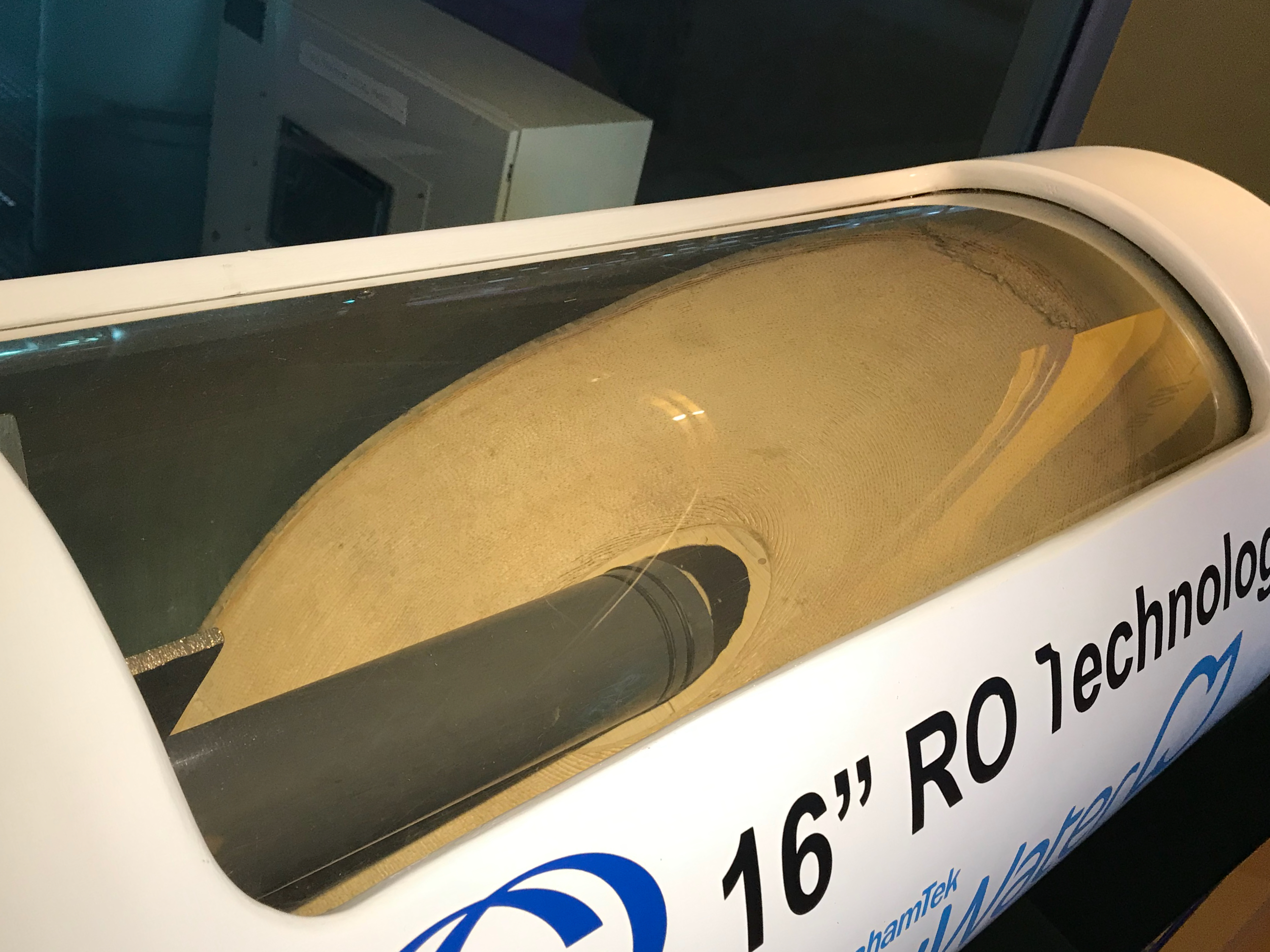
Cutaway of a reverse osmosis module

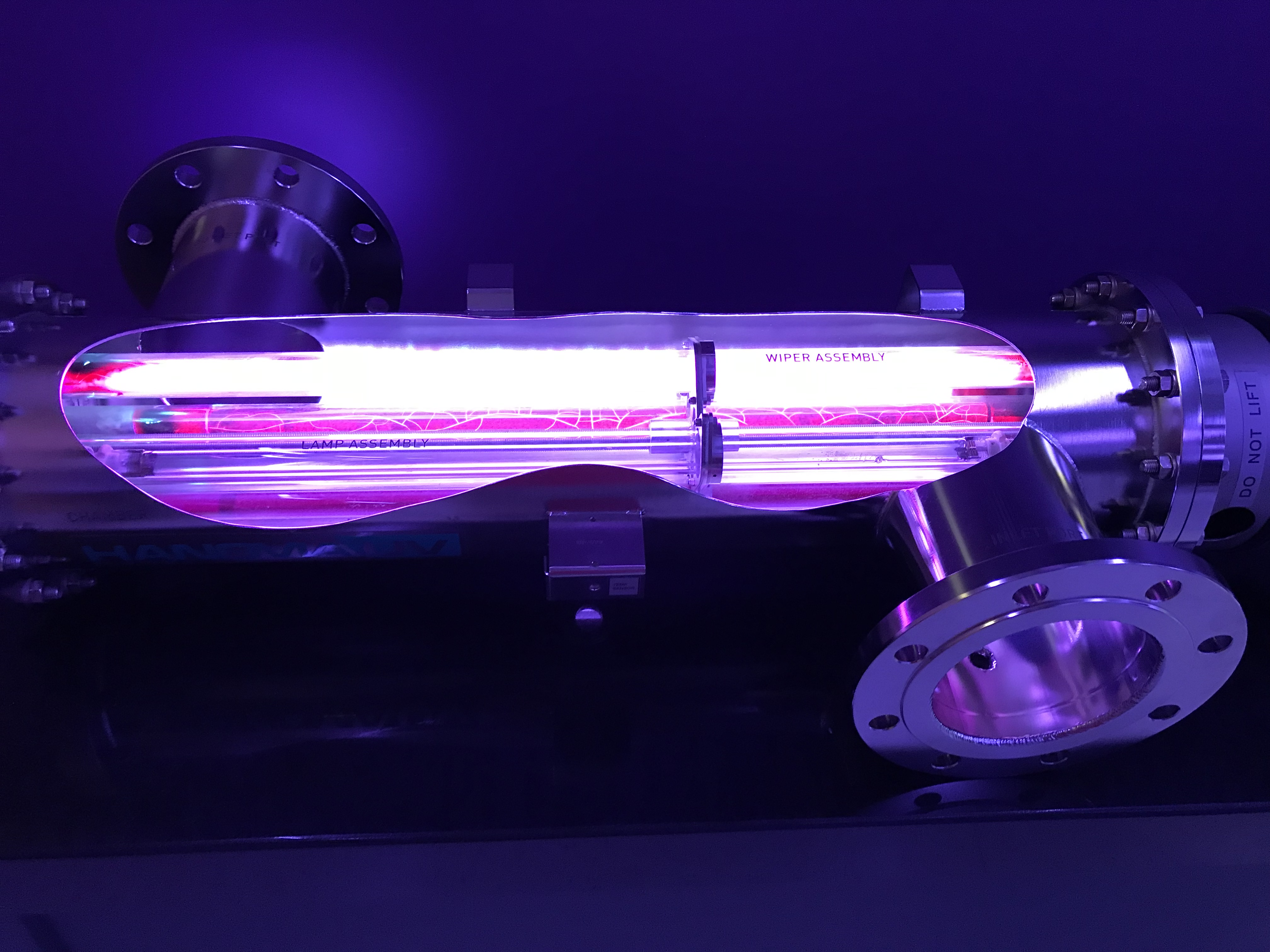
Cutaway model of UV disinfection unit

Since 2002, there have been pilot programs to consider replacing the activated sludge process of the secondary sewage treatment and the microfiltration/ultrafiltration stage of the NEWater with a membrane bioreactor process.

== Applications ==
The total capacity of the plants is about 200 million US gallons per day (760,000 m^{3}/d). About 6% of this is used for indirect potable use, equal to about 1% of Singapore's potable water requirement of 380 million US gallons per day (1,400,000 m^{3}/d). The rest is used at wafer fabrication plants and other non-potable applications in industries in Woodlands, Tampines, Pasir Ris, and Ang Mo Kio.

Government figures show that the country's NEWater plans can meet up to 40% of Singapore's current needs, and the figure is expected to go up to 55% by 2060.

=== Potability ===
The quality of NEWater consistently exceeds the requirements set by USEPA and WHO guidelines and is cleaner than other water sources in Singapore.

The following table compares the water quality of NEWater to the WHO and USEPA standards.

Quality Chart
Water Quality Parameters	NEWater	USEPA /WHO Standards
A) Physical
Turbidity (NTU)	<5	5/5
Colour (Hazen Units)	<5	15/15
Conductivity (μS/cm)	<250	Not Specified
pH Value	7.0–8.5	6.5–8.5
Total Dissolved Solids (mg/L)	<150	500/1000
Total Organic Carbon (mg/L)	<0.5	-/-
Total Hardness (CaCO_{3})(mg/L)	<50	Not Available
B) Chemical (mg/L)
Ammoniacal nitrogen (as N)	<1.0	-/1.2
Chloride (Cl)	<20	250/250
Fluoride (F)	<0.5	4/1.5
Nitrate (NO_{3})	<15	10/11
Silica (SiO_{2})	<3	-/-
Sulphate (SO_{4})	<5	250/250
Residual Chlorine (Cl, Total)	<2	4/5
Total Trihalomethanes (as mg/L)	<0.08	0.08/-
C) Metals (mg/L)
Aluminum	<0.1	0.05–0.2/0.2
Barium	<0.1	2/0.7
Boron	<0.5	-/0.5
Calcium	4 - 20	-/-
Copper	<0.05	1.3/2
Iron	<0.04	0.3/0.3
Manganese	<0.05	0.05/0.4
Sodium	<20	-/200
Strontium	<0.1	-/-
Zinc	<0.1	5/3
D) Bacteriological
Total Coliform Bacteria (Counts/100 mL)	Not detectable	Not detectable
Enterovirus	Not detectable	Not detectable
Heterotrophic Plate Count (CFU/mL, 35 °C, 48 h)	<300	<500/-

== See also ==
- Water supply and sanitation in Singapore
