= Jurong Island desalination plant =

Desalination plant in Singapore

Coordinates: 1.2752°N 103.6665°E

Jurong Island desalination plant is a desalination plant on Jurong Island in Singapore. It is the fifth desalination plant in Singapore.

== History ==
The feasibility of a fifth desalination plant in the Tembusu Multi-Utilities Complex on Jurong Island was first explored by the Public Utilities Board in 2016, prior to the completion of the Tuas desalination plant and the Keppel Marina East desalination plant. Jurong Island was chosen as the location for the next desalination plant as factories on the island took up about a tenth of the water demand in Singapore. The plant was initially planned to be completed by 2020. Plans to build the plant were publicly announced by then Minister for the Environment and Water Resources Masagos Zulkifli on 12 July 2016. The Tuas Power-Singapore Technologies Marine consortium was selected as the preferred bidder on 27 September 2017.

The plant was opened on 17 April 2022 by the Public Utilities Board, after a delay of two years due to the COVID-19 pandemic. The plant is run by three people, and can be run by a minimum of two people. The plant can produce up to 7% of the water demand of Singapore.
