= Middle =

Middle or The Middle may refer to:

- Centre (geometry), the point equally distant from the outer limits

== Places ==
- Middle (sheading), a subdivision of the Isle of Man
- Middle Bay (disambiguation)
- Middle Brook (disambiguation)
- Middle Creek (disambiguation)
- Middle Island (disambiguation)
- Middle Lake (disambiguation)
- Middle Mountain, California
- Middle Peninsula, Chesapeake Bay, Virginia
- Middle Range, a former name of the Xueshan Range on Taiwan Island
- Middle River (disambiguation)
- Middle Rocks, two rocks at the eastern opening of the Straits of Singapore
- Middle Sound, a bay in North Carolina
- Middle Township (disambiguation)
- Middle East

== Music ==
- "Middle" (song), by DJ Snake featuring Bipolar Sunshine, 2015
- "The Middle" (Jimmy Eat World song), 2001
- "The Middle" (Zedd, Maren Morris and Grey song), 2018
- "Middle", a song by Rocket from the Crypt from their 1995 album Scream, Dracula, Scream!
- "The Middle", a song by Demi Lovato from their debut album Don't Forget
- "The Middle", a song by The Doubleclicks from their album President Snakes
- "The Middle", a song by Lauren Alaina from her album Wildflower
- "The Middle", a song by Trampled by Turtles from their album Life Is Good on the Open Road

== Other uses ==
- The Middle (TV series)
- Middle Road (disambiguation)
- Middle school, an educational stage in some countries

== See also ==
- Center (disambiguation)
- Core (disambiguation)
- Seed
