= Straits Settlement and Johore Territorial Waters Agreement of 1927 =

1927 treaty between the United Kingdom and Johor

Straits Settlements and Johore Territorial Waters (Agreement) Act 1928 (Note: Section 2.)
- Act of Parliament
- Parliament of the United Kingdom
- Long title: An Act to approve an Agreement concluded between His Majesty and the Sultan of the State and Territory of Johore.
- Citation: 18 & 19 Geo. 5. c. 23
- Territorial extent: United Kingdom

Dates
- Royal assent: 3 August 1928
- Commencement: 3 August 1928 (Note: The Acts of Parliament (Commencement) Act 1793.)
- Repealed: 18 July 1973

Other legislation
- Repealed by: Statute Law (Repeals) Act 1973

Status: Repealed

Text of statute as originally enacted

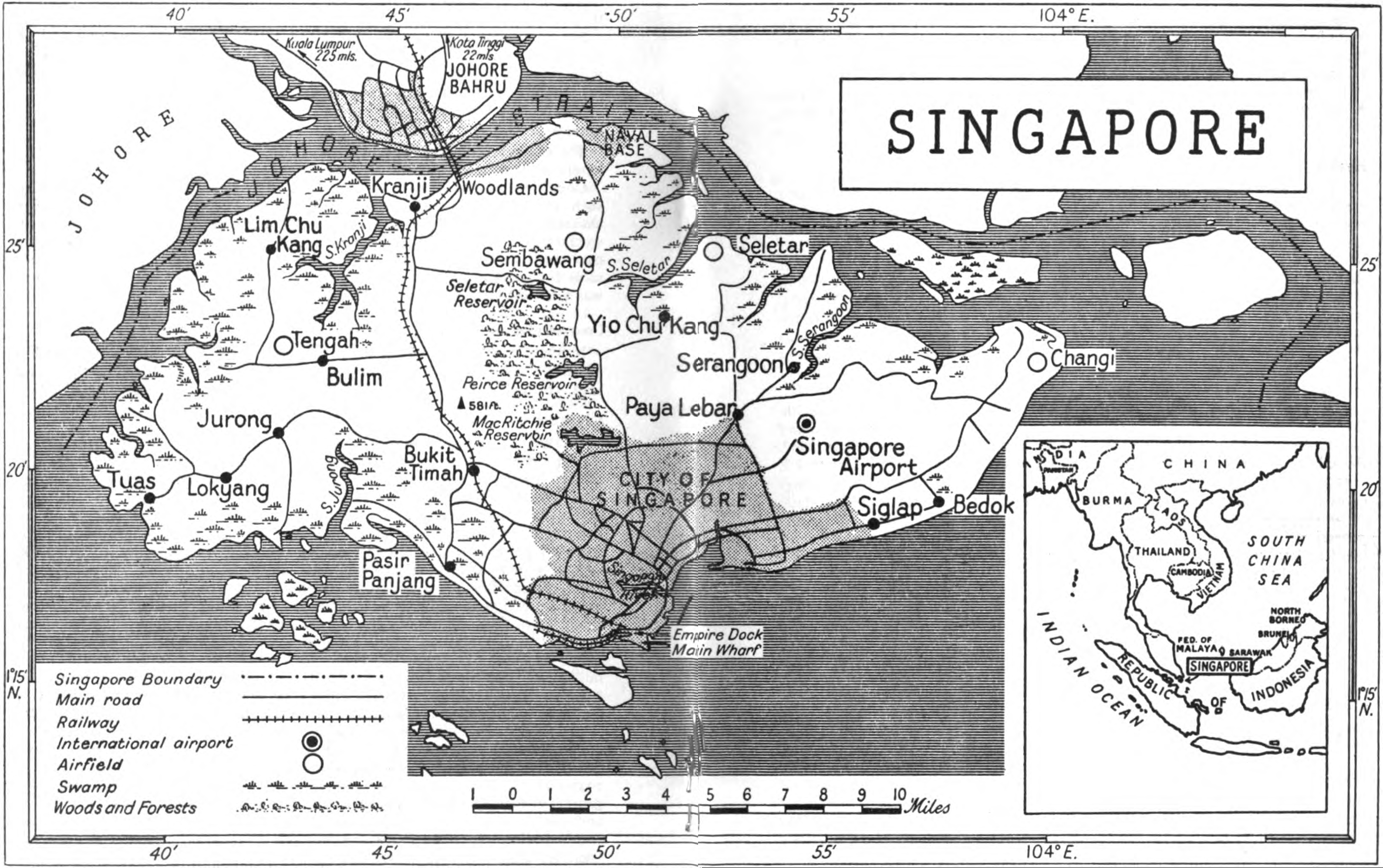
Map of the Jahore Strait from The State of Singapore (BIS, 1959) A map of Singapore published in The State of Singapore, published by the British Information Services (BIS) in April 1959. This image is a composite map of two pages in the book, each having one half of the map.

The Straits Settlement and Johore Territorial Waters Agreement of 1927 was a treaty signed between the United Kingdom, as the colonial ruler of the Straits Settlements (including Singapore), and the Sultanate of Johor, a nominally sovereign state at the time. The agreement sought to define the maritime boundary between Singapore and Johor along the Straits of Johor. Both Malaysia, of which Johor is a component state, and Singapore are successor states to the agreement. This treaty formed the basis for the current border agreement between Malaysia and Singapore, which was formally codified in 1995.

== Background ==
The Johor Strait, a waterway separating Singapore from Johor, Malaysia, had long been an area of jurisdictional ambiguity. The 1824 Treaty of London, signed between the British East India Company, Temenggong, and the Johor Sultanate, established British sovereignty over Singapore and waters within ten miles of its coastline. This treaty led to disputes over fishing rights and territorial jurisdiction, particularly between Singaporean Chinese fishermen and the Malay population of Johor. In 1861, eight Singaporean Chinese were murdered at Pulau Tingi, leading to a trial in Singapore and a reinforcement of British legal authority over the region. Both British and Johor authorities at the time exercised jurisdiction over different areas of the Strait, with the boundaries drawing near the middle of the channel. The need to establish a clear maritime boundary resulted in the 1927 Straits Settlement and Johor Territorial Waters Agreement, attempting to define the boundary between Singapore and Johor using an “imaginary line” in the deep-water channel. British jurisdiction was reduced, retroceding some waters and islets to the Johor administration.

== Signing of the Agreement ==
The treaty was signed in Singapore on 19 October 1927 between Sir Hugh Charles Clifford, then Governor of the Straits Settlements, and Sultan Ibrahim of Johor. Witnesses included J.D. Hall, J. Huggins (Colonial Administration of Penang), Abdullah Bin Jafar (Dato Mentri Besar of Johor), and Haji Mohamed Said Bin Haji Suleiman (Captain and secretary to the Sultan). The agreement was later ratified by the British Parliament, as required under its provisions.

== Key Provisions of the 1927 Agreement ==
The treaty defined territorial jurisdiction through an imaginary line in the deep-water channel of the Johor Strait. The principal articles included:

=== Article 1: Boundary Definition ===
The border was set along the deep-water channel in the Johor Strait. Singapore retained sovereignty over Pulau Ubin, Pulau Tekong Kechil, and Pulau Tekong Besar.

=== Article 2: Sovereignty of Waters ===
Johor retained control over all waters within three nautical miles of its mainland.

=== Article 3: Retrocession of Territory ===
Certain islets and waters were officially returned to Johor’s administration.

=== Article 4: Ratification Clause ===
The treaty required approval from the British Parliament before coming into effect.

== Perspectives and Challenges of the 1927 Agreement ==
=== Singapore’s Perspective ===
Singapore viewed the agreement as an attempt to clarify territorial waters; however, the treaty’s reliance on an "imaginary line" left ambiguities that later led to disputes. Singaporean officials noted concerns over jurisdictional confusion, particularly in maritime law enforcement and fishing rights. At the time, Singapore did not strongly contest British decisions, as it was still a colony under British rule.

=== 1928 Report ===
A 1928 report from the Straits Settlement administration documented enforcement difficulties arising from the treaty. Singaporean authorities reported legal inconsistencies in maritime policing, economic disruptions for fishing and trade industries due to undefined borders, and growing tensions between fishermen from both sides who inadvertently crossed into disputed waters. The report highlighted the need for further clarification and potential modifications to the agreement.

=== Malaysia (Johor)’s Perspective ===
Johor viewed the agreement as a partial victory, as it regained sovereignty over certain islets and waters within three nautical miles of its mainland. However, Article 3 concerning the retrocession of territory did not fully satisfy Johor’s leadership as British influence in the region remained strong. Furthermore, continued jurisdictional ambiguity over the Johor Strait led to difficulties in resource management and enforcement, particularly as economic activities expanded. Between the signing of the 1927 treaty and the resolution in 1995, there were multiple instances of diplomatic disputes. Due to land reclamation projects by both Singapore and the state of Johor, the deep-water channel shifted as a result, causing disputes over determining the boundary.

== Post-1927 Treaty Disputes and Developments ==
Despite the agreement, jurisdictional disputes persisted due to the absence of physical demarcation. Land reclamation projects by both Singapore and Johor altered the maritime geography, resulting in fishermen from both countries accidentally crossing onto the other side and complicating boundary enforcement. The following events highlight key developments:

=== 1982 Joint Survey Initiative ===
In an attempt to resolve the issue of boundary enforcement, the Malay and Singaporean governments launched a joint survey to redefine boundaries in 1982, with their seventh meeting finalizing the boundary in 1994.

=== 1995 Malaysia-Singapore Territorial Waters Agreement ===
This treaty replaced the 1927 agreement, incorporating precise geographical coordinates and formalizing jurisdictional claims.

== Pedra Branca Dispute ==
A map showing the approximate location of the island of Pedra Branca, which is under the sovereignty of Singapore, at the eastern end of the Singapore Strait where it meets the South China Sea. Near it are the maritime features Middle Rocks (under Malaysian sovereignty) and South Ledge, and the coasts of Johor, Malaysia, and Bintan, Indonesia.

One of the most significant disputes related to the 1927 agreement involved Pedra Branca, a small island located at the eastern entrance of the Singapore Strait. Singapore had exercised sovereignty over the island since colonial times, but in 1979, Malaysia included Pedra Branca on an official government map as part of its territory. Bilateral negotiations between Singapore and Malaysia over ownership of the island failed to reach a settlement. Though the island was left out of the 1927 Territorial Waters Agreement, ownership of the island was a factor in determining sovereign waters within the channel. In 1989, Singapore suggesting the issue be submitted to the International Court of Justice (ICJ) which Malaysia consented to in 1994.

In 2003, ICJ arbitration began with three rounds of written pleas submitted by both parties. Singapore argued that Pedra Branca was Singaporean as they claimed the island was terra nullius before Britain took control of the island, on the basis that it was included within Singaporean territory when Britain granted its independence. Malaysia argued that Pedra Branca had been part of the Sultanate of Johor before British conquest and that it had never formally been conquered or transferred to Singapore upon independence.

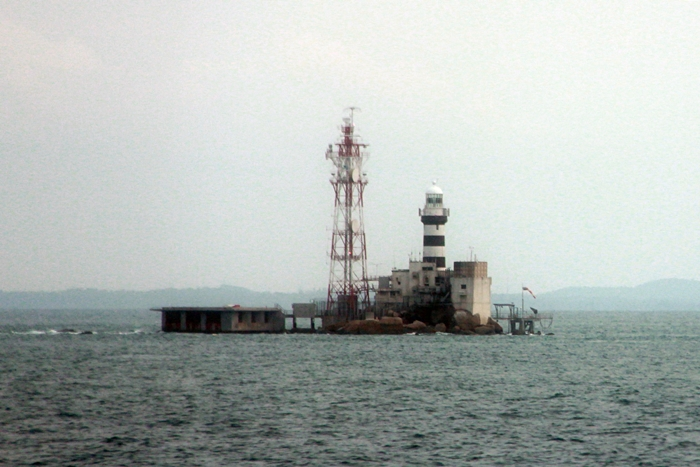
Image of Pedra Branca

In 2008, the ICJ ruled that Pedra Branca belonged to Singapore, with their decision centering largely on Malaysia’s lack of attempts to assert sovereignty over the island between 1927 and 1979 as evidence of tacit recognition of Singaporean authority. Though they recognised that Pedra Branca had been part of the Johor Sultanate, the lack of Malaysian responses to British and later Singaporean exercises of sovereignty granted sovereignty to Singapore. However, Middle Rocks were transferred to Malaysia, with the ICJ ruling that South Ledge “belongs to the State in the territorial waters of which it is located”.

In 2017, Malaysia filed for an application to revise the ICJ ruling and soon after filed another application of interpretation of the ICJ ruling. Malaysia dropped both actions in early 2018 with both parties withdrawing their applications and affirming the 2008 decision as final.

== 1995 Malaysia (Johor)-Singapore Territorial Waters Boundary Agreement ==
In 1981, after decades of land reclamations by both Malaysia and Singapore, the centre-line of the Johor Strait had shifted, raising concerns for both nations as to the delineation of their maritime border. In 1982, talks began between the two nations to determine how to definitively delineate their border, with bathymetric surveys executed by both parties to determine the deepest points of the strait.

By 1994, the bathymetric surveys were finalized, turning over 72 ‘fixed points’ based on the Strait’s depth acting as the formal border between Singapore and Malaysia. The agreement was reached in 1994 and finalised in 1995, upholding the 1927 agreement as still valid, with the 1994 agreement only clarifying the ‘imaginary line’ from 1927 into a fixed line, though both parties agreed that the border not be delineated by buoys in order to not impede maritime activities. The agreement was praised by the Prime Ministers of both Malaysia and Singapore as the continued exercise of bilateral negotiation in conflict resolution, and acted as a victory for both parties in light of the more contentious dispute over the island of Pedra Branca which had added tension to relations between the two nations.

== 2018 Boundary Dispute ==
In 2018, Malaysia extended the official boundaries of the port of Johor Bahru, encroaching into Singaporean waters as recognised by the 1994 border pact. Concurrently, the airspace within the overlapping claims became contested as well. Singapore asserted that Malaysia had encroached into their maritime territory as recognised by the 1994 agreement and the 2008 ICJ ruling regarding Pedra Branca. Furthermore, they argued that due to their continued management of the airspace over the disputed waters since 1974, their authority extended to the waters beneath as well. Malaysia responded by declaring the airspace a military training area, prohibiting the use of the airspace without permission from the Malaysian government.

The dispute was noted as being the worst point in relations between the two nations in two decades, and led to a brief period of increasingly animous exchanges between governments in stark contrast to their mutual agreement to accept the ICJ ruling over Pedra Branca only months earlier. Soon after, a bilateral working group was established to settle issues regarding maritime and airspace boundaries, though did not reach a conclusion within its assigned two month deadline. In January 2019, both nations made concessions to de-escalate the issue; Malaysia suspended its declaration of the airspace as being military airspace, allowing a return to normal usage and management by Singapore, while Singapore agreed not to implement its planned maritime border enforcement operations. The issue does however remain unresolved as of April 2025, though it has not re-emerged in any political contest since mutual concessions were made.

== See also ==
- Malaysia-Singapore Border
