= Responses to the COVID-19 pandemic in April 2022 =

Aspect of viral disease pandemic

This article documents the chronology of the response to the COVID-19 pandemic in April 2022, which originated in Wuhan, China in December 2019. Some developments may become known or fully understood only in retrospect. Reporting on this pandemic began in December 2019.

== Reactions and measures in the Americas ==
=== 19 April ===
- United States District Judge Kathryn Kimball Mizelle ruled against the Centers for Disease Control and Prevention's (CDC) facemask mandate for airlines and public transportation.

== Reactions and measures in South, East and Southeast Asia ==
=== 1 April ===
- The Malaysia–Singapore border reopened to travel by private transport without the need for testing and isolation. Travellers will still have to be vaccinated while unvaccinated children under the age of 12 years and below will have to be accompanied by a fully vaccinated adult.

=== 27 April ===
- The Malaysian Government has announced that it will ease restrictions on unvaccinated individuals entering public spaces from 1 May 2022. In addition, the Government eliminated pre-flight and on-arrival testing requirements for fully vaccinated travellers and those who have just recovered from COVID-19. While mask requirements for outdoor settings were lifted, they remain mandatory for indoor activities and public transport.

== Reactions and measures in the Western Pacific ==
=== 13 April ===
- New Zealand's COVID-19 Response Minister Chris Hipkins announced that the country would shift to the "orange setting" of New Zealand's COVID-19 Protection Framework from 11:59 pm. Capacity limits for public gatherings were eliminated while facemasks will no longer be compulsory for schools and certain public gatherings and events.

== See also ==
- Timeline of the COVID-19 pandemic in April 2022
- Responses to the COVID-19 pandemic
