= Chung Wan =

Chung Wan may refer to:

- Central, Hong Kong Island, Hong Kong
  - Chung Wan constituency of the Central and Western District Council
- Chung Wan, Crooked Island, New Territories, Hong Kong
- Chung Wan, Lai Chi Wo, New Territories, Hong Kong

See also

- Middle Bay (disambiguation)
