= Middle Lake =

Middle Lake may refer to:

== Canada ==
- Middle Lake, Saskatchewan, a village
- Middle Lake (Nova Scotia), a lake in Richmond County
- Middle Lake (Kenora District), a lake in Kenora District, Ontario
- Middle Lake (Sudbury District), a lake in Sudbury District, Ontario
- Middle Lake (Algoma District), a lake in Algoma District, Ontario
- Middle Lake (Stormont, Dundas and Glengarry United Counties), a lake in Stormont, Dundas and Glengarry United Counties, Ontario

== United States ==
- Middle Lake (Bradley County, Arkansas), a lake of Bradley County, Arkansas
- Middle Lake Trail, a hiking trail in Eagle County, Colorado
- Middle Lake (Independence Township, Michigan), a lake
- Middle Lake, a lake in Nicollet County, Minnesota

== See also ==
- Middle Lakes, Argyle, Nova Scotia, Canada
