= Pemmaraju Sreenivasa Rao =

Indian lawyer (1942–2025)

Pemmaraju Sreenivasa Rao (1942 – 17 March 2025), also known as Sreenivasa Rao Pemmaraju, was an Indian international lawyer who headed the Legal and Treaties Division, Ministry of External Affairs, India, and was the chief legal advisor of India on international law matters from 1985 to 2002. He was Judge Ad Hoc of International Court of Justice in the case concerning sovereignty over Pedra Branca/Pulau Batu Pateh, Middle Rocks and South Ledge (Malaysia/Singapore) (2004–2008). Rao was a member of the International Law Commission from 1987 to 2006, and a Special Rapporteur for the subject of Prevention and Liability. He was also Chairman of International Law Commission.

Rao was a special adviser in the office of the Attorney-General, State of Qatar and Visiting Professor at the Center for International Law Studies, Jawaharlal Nehru University, New Delhi. He was also an honorary visiting professor at Damodaram Sanjivayya National Law University, Visakhapatnam.

He was also a member of Bay of Bengal Maritime Boundary Arbitration tribunal (Bangladesh/India) (2010–2014).

== Background ==
Rao was born in Andhra Pradesh, British India in 1942. He was educated at Andhra University, Waltair, and at Yale Law School (1967–1970). He earned a Bachelor of Laws and a Master of Laws degree with specialization in international law from Andhra and also an LL.M. and J.S.D. from Yale. Professor Rao worked as a Post Doctoral Fellow at the Woodrow Wilson International Center for Scholars, Washington, D.C., and at the Marine Policy Center of Woods Hole Oceanographic Institution, Woods Hole, Massachusetts. He published Public Order of the Ocean Resources and has contributed several articles on the negotiation of the Law of the Sea Convention, 1982. Rao participated in its negotiations from 1976-1984.

Post-doctoral works:

- Fellow, the Woodrow Wilson International Center for Scholars, Washington, DC.
- Fellow, Marine Policy Programme, Woods Hole Oceanographic Institution, Woods Hole, Mass., USA.
- Research Associate, The Indian School of International Studies, Sapru House, New Delhi.

Rao died on 17 March 2025, at the age of 83.

== Sources ==
- The Public Order of Ocean Resources: A Critique of the Contemporary Law of the Sea
- List of members of the International Law Commission
- Pedra Branca dispute

Petra Branca Separate Opinion

- Role of Soft Law in the Development of International Law
- Faculty at University of Michigan Law School
- Audio Visual Library of International Law

http://students.law.umich.edu/mjil/uploads/articles/v25n4-rao.pdf

- Bay of Bengal Maritime Boundary Arbitration (Bangladesh/India)
- Supreme Court judge, MEA ex-secretary slug it out for International Court of Justice post
- Biography of Pemmaraju Sreenivasa Rao
