= Middle River =

Middle River may be:

== Places ==
=== Australia ===
- Middle River, South Australia, a locality on Kangaroo Island

=== Canada ===
- Middle River, British Columbia, formerly Middle River Village, a settlement in the Omineca Country of the Central Interior of British Columbia, Canada
- Middle River, Nova Scotia

=== United States ===
- Middle River, Maryland
- Middle River, Minnesota
- Middle River, Wisconsin

== Rivers ==
=== Australia ===
- Middle River (South Australia), a river in the north of Kangaroo Island

=== United States ===
- Middle River (Alabama)
- Middle River (California)
- Middle River (Iowa)
- Middle River (Maine)
- Middle River (Maryland)
- Middle River (Massachusetts), a tributary of the Blackstone River
- Middle River (Minnesota)
- Middle River (Missouri River tributary)
- Middle River (North Carolina), a major water body in Bertie County, North Carolina
- Middle River (Virginia)
- Middle River (Wisconsin), a river in the United States

=== Canada ===
- Middle River (British Columbia), a river in the Omineca Country in the Central Interior of British Columbia, Canada
- Middle River (New Brunswick), a river near the City of Bathurst, New Brunswick, Canada
- The Kinbasket River (previously Middle River), a tributary of the Columbia River via the Kinbasket Lake reservoir in southeastern British Columbia, Canada

=== Isle of Man ===
- Middle River (Isle of Man)

== See also ==
- Middle (disambiguation)
