= Middle Island =

Middle Island may refer to:

== Australia ==
- Middle Island (South Australia), South Australia
- Middle Island (Warrnambool), south-western Victoria
- Western Australia:
  - Middle Island (Lacepede Islands)
  - Middle Island (King Sound)
  - Middle Island (Barrow Island)
  - Middle Island (Houtman Abrolhos)
  - Middle Island (Western Australia)

== Canada ==
- Middle Island (Lake Erie), in Ontario, the southernmost point of land in Canada, part of Point Pelee National Park

== New Zealand ==
- Ātiu or Middle Island, New Zealand, formerly known as Middle Island
- Middle Island, archaic 19th century name for New Zealand's South Island

== United States ==
- Middle Island (West Virginia), on the Ohio River
- Middle Island, New York, settlement on Long Island
- Middle Island (Lake Huron), Michigan island in Lake Huron

== Elsewhere ==
- Middle Island, Falkland Islands
- Middle Island, Hong Kong, off Repulse Bay on southern Hong Kong Island
- Middle Island, Tristan da Cunha, small British island in the South Atlantic Ocean
- Passport Island, artificial island located on the Bahrain–Saudi Arabia border also called Middle Island

== See also ==
- Middle Brother (disambiguation)
