= Malaysia–Singapore border =

International border

Coordinates: 1.2117°N 103.6125°E

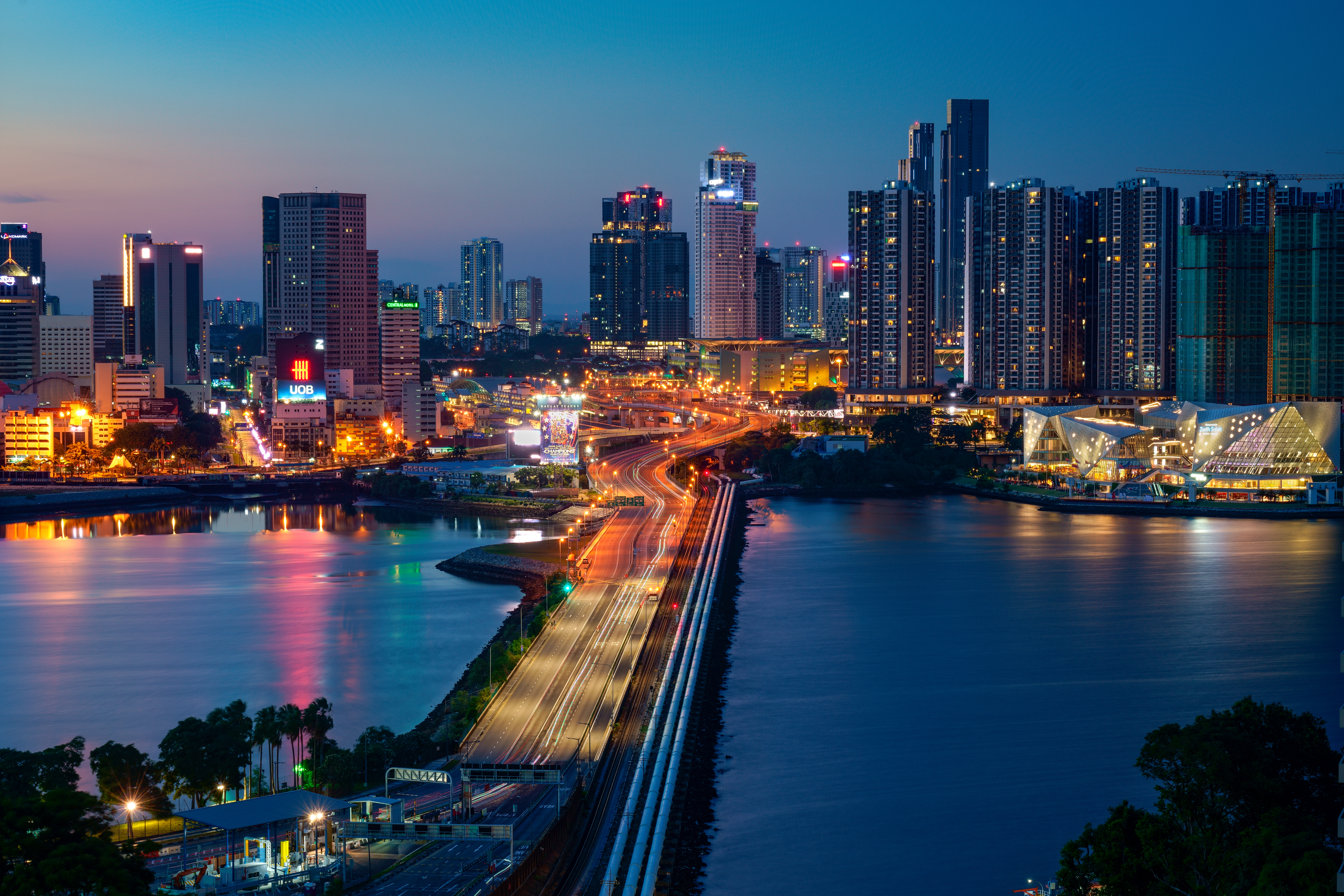
- The Johor–Singapore Causeway between Malaysia and Singapore. The end of Singaporean territory in the foreground (Woodlands) and the start of Malaysian territory in the background (Johor Bahru) can be clearly seen with the differences in road surface, street lights and markings near the midsection of the causeway.

Characteristics
- Entities: Singapore Malaysia

History
- Established: 9 August 1965; Proclamation of Singapore
- Current shape: 23 May 2008
- Treaties: 1819 Singapore Treaty; Straits Settlement and Johore Territorial Waters Agreement of 1927; 1995 Singapore–Malaysia Maritime Agreement; 2008 ICJ decision on Pedra Branca

The Malaysia–Singapore border (Note: Chinese: 马来西亚–新加坡边界; Malay: Sempadan Malaysia–Singapura; Tamil: மலேசியா-சிங்கப்பூர் எல்லை) is an international maritime border between the Southeast Asian countries of Malaysia, which lies to the north of the border, and Singapore to the south. The boundary is formed by straight lines between maritime geographical coordinates running along or near the deepest channel of the Straits of Johor. (Note: Chinese: 柔佛海峡; Malay: Selat Tebrau; Tamil: ஜொகூர் நீரிணை)

The western portion of the border, beyond that delimited by the 1995 agreement, goes into the western section of the Straits of Singapore while the eastern portion of the border beyond the eastern terminus of the defined border continues into the eastern section of the straits. Outside the border defined by the 1995 agreement, there is still no formal agreement between the two countries to delimit their common borders and this has resulted in several overlapping claims. Singapore claims a territorial sea limit that extends up to 12 nautical miles and an exclusive economic zone (EEZ), while Malaysia claims a 12 nautical mile territorial sea limit.

Following the International Court of Justice (ICJ) decision on 23 May 2008 over Pedra Branca which recognised Singapore's sovereignty on the island, the new portion of the Malaysia–Singapore maritime eastern border around the island will also need to be determined. The island lies 24 nautical miles (44 km) from the next easternmost point of Singapore, and 7.7 nautical miles (14.3 km) southeast of the Malaysian coastline. There are two structural crossings along the border. They are the Johor–Singapore Causeway and the Malaysia–Singapore Second Link (officially known as the Tuas Second Link in Singapore). There are also international ferry and bumboat services between Pengerang at the southeastern tip of Johor, Malaysia and Changi at the eastern end of Singapore.

== The border ==
=== Delimited boundary ===
A large extent of the Malaysia–Singapore border is defined by the Agreement between the Government of Malaysia and the Government of the Republic of Singapore to delimit precisely the territorial waters boundary in accordance with the Straits Settlement and Johore Territorial Waters Agreement 1927 as being straight lines joining a series of 72 geographical coordinates roughly running about 50 nautical miles (93 km) along the deepest channel (thalweg) between the western and eastern entrances of the Straits of Johor. This delineation was arrived at and agreed to jointly by the two governments and resulted in the agreement being signed on 7 August 1995.

The coordinates, which are stated in Annex 1 of the agreement, are listed below. The datum used is the Revised Kertau Datum, Everest Spheroid (Malaya), Malaysian Rectified Skew Orthomorphic projection.

| Point | Latitude | Longitude | Point | Latitude | Longitude | Point | Latitude | Longitude |
East of Johor–Singapore Causeway
| E1 | 01° 27' 10.0" | 103° 46' 16.0" | E17 | 01° 25' 49.5" | 103° 56' 00.3" | E33 | 01° 26' 38.0" | 104° 02' 27.0" |
| E2 | 01° 27' 54.5" | 103° 47' 25.7" | E18 | 01° 25' 49.7" | 103° 56' 15.7" | E34 | 01° 26' 23.5" | 104° 03' 26.9" |
| E3 | 01° 28' 35.4" | 103° 48' 13.2" | E19 | 01° 25' 40.2" | 103° 56' 33.1" | E35 | 01° 26' 04.7" | 104° 04' 16.3" |
| E4 | 01° 28' 42.5" | 103° 48' 45.6" | E20 | 01° 25' 31.3" | 103° 57' 09.1" | E36 | 01° 25' 51.3" | 104° 04' 35.3" |
| E5 | 01° 28' 36.1" | 103° 49' 19.8" | E21 | 01° 25' 27.9" | 103° 57' 27.2" | E37 | 01° 25' 03.3" | 104° 05' 18.5" |
| E6 | 01° 28' 22.8" | 103° 50' 03.0" | E22 | 01° 25' 29.1" | 103° 57' 38.4" | E38 | 01° 24' 55.8" | 104° 05' 22.6" |
| E7 | 01° 27' 58.2" | 103° 51' 07.2" | E23 | 01° 25' 19.8" | 103° 58' 00.5" | E39 | 01° 24' 44.8" | 104° 05' 26.7" |
| E8 | 01° 27' 46.6" | 103° 51' 31.2" | E24 | 01° 25' 19.0" | 103° 58' 20.7" | E40 | 01° 24' 21.4" | 104° 05' 33.6" |
| E9 | 01° 27' 31.9" | 103° 51' 53.9" | E25 | 01° 25' 27.9" | 103° 58' 47.7" | E41 | 01° 23' 59.3" | 104° 05' 34.9" |
| E10 | 01° 27' 23.5" | 103° 52' 05.4" | E26 | 01° 25' 27.4" | 103° 59' 00.9" | E42 | 01° 23' 39.3" | 104° 05' 32.9" |
| E11 | 01° 26' 56.3" | 103° 52' 30.1" | E27 | 01° 25' 29.7" | 103° 59' 10.2" | E43 | 01° 23' 04.9" | 104° 05' 22.4" |
| E12 | 01° 26' 06.5" | 103° 53' 10.1" | E28 | 01° 25' 29.2" | 103° 59' 20.5" | E44 | 01° 22' 07.5" | 104° 05' 00.9" |
| E13 | 01° 25' 40.6" | 103° 53' 52.3" | E29 | 01° 25' 30.0" | 103° 59' 34.5" | E45 | 01° 21' 27.0" | 104° 04' 47.0" |
| E14 | 01° 25' 39.1" | 103° 54' 45.9" | E30 | 01° 25' 25.3" | 103° 59' 42.9" | E46 | 01° 20' 48.0" | 104° 05' 07.0" |
| E15 | 01° 25' 36.0" | 103° 55' 00.6" | E31 | 01° 25' 14.2" | 104° 00' 10.3" | E47 | 01° 17' 21.3" | 104° 07' 34.0" |
| E16 | 01° 25' 41.7" | 103° 55' 24.0" | E32 | 01° 26' 20.9" | 104° 01' 23.9" | | | |
West of Johor–Singapore Causeway
| W1 | 01° 27' 09.8" | 103° 46' 15.7" | W10 | 01° 26' 14.1" | 103° 41' 00.0" | W19 | 01° 21' 26.6" | 103° 38' 15.5" |
| W2 | 01° 26' 54.2" | 103° 45' 38.5" | W11 | 01° 25' 41.3" | 103° 40' 26.0" | W20 | 01° 21' 07.3" | 103° 38' 08.0" |
| W3 | 01° 27' 01.4" | 103° 44' 48.4" | W12 | 01° 24' 56.7" | 103° 40' 10.0" | W21 | 01° 20' 27.8" | 103° 37' 48.2" |
| W4 | 01° 27' 16.6" | 103° 44' 23.3" | W13 | 01° 24' 37.7" | 103° 39' 50.1" | W22 | 01° 19' 17.8" | 103° 37' 04.2" |
| W5 | 01° 27' 36.5" | 103° 43' 42.0" | W14 | 01° 24' 01.5" | 103° 39' 25.8" | W23 | 01° 18' 55.5" | 103° 37' 01.5" |
| W6 | 01° 27' 26.9" | 103° 42' 50.8" | W15 | 01° 23' 28.6" | 103° 39' 12.6" | W24 | 01° 18' 51.5" | 103° 36' 58.2" |
| W7 | 01° 27' 02.8" | 103° 42' 13.5" | W16 | 01° 23' 13.5" | 103° 39' 10.7" | W25 | 01° 15' 51.0" | 103° 36' 10.3" |
| W8 | 01° 26' 35.9" | 103° 41' 55.9" | W17 | 01° 22' 47.7" | 103° 38' 57.1" | | | |
| W9 | 01° 26' 23.6" | 103° 41' 38.6" | W18 | 01° 21' 46.7" | 103° 38' 27.2" | | | |

The Straits Settlement and Johore Territorial Waters Agreement of 1927 signed between the Britain and the Sultanate of Johor on 19 October 1927, defines the territorial sea border between Malaysia and Singapore as:

"... an imaginary line following the centre of the deep-water channel in Johore Strait, between the mainland of the State and Territory of Johore on the one side, and the northern shores of the islands of Singapore, Pulau Ubin, Pulau Tekong Kechil, and Pulau Tekong Besar on the other side. Where, if at all, the channel divides into two portions of equal depth running side by side, the boundary shall run midway between these two portions. At the western entrance of Johore Strait, the boundary, after passing through the centre of the deep-water channel eastward of Pulau Merambong, shall proceed seaward, in the general direction of the axis of this channel produced, until it intersects the 3-mile (4.8 km) limit drawn from the low water mark of the south coast of Pulau Merambong. At the Eastern entrance of Johore Strait, the boundary shall be held to pass through the centre of the deep-water channel between the mainland of Johore, westward of Johore Hill, and Pulau Tekong Besar, next through the centre of the deep-water channel between Johore Shoal and the mainland of Johore, southward of Johore Hill, and finally turning southward, to intersect the 3-mile (4.8 km) limit drawn from the low water mark of the mainland of Johore in a position bearing 192 degrees from Tanjong Sitapa."

The boundary drawn by the 1995 agreement follows closely but, by virtue of being straight lines between points, does not exactly correspond with the deepest channel of the Straits of Johor as described in the 1927 agreement. As the 1995 agreement supersedes the 1927 agreement as far as any inconsistency goes, the thalweg method of determining the precise borderline is therefore replaced with the use of geographical coordinates. The 1995 agreement also states that the border will be final and, therefore, not be influenced by any variation of the depth or alignment of the deepest channel of the Straits of Johor. This is important considering frequent reclamation activities by both Malaysia and Singapore in the Straits of Johor which could alter the depth of the waterway.

=== Undetermined boundaries ===
The border outside the points agreed to in the 1995 agreement has not been determined and is subject to some level of contention. In 1979, Malaysia published a map unilaterally defining its territorial waters and continental shelf, "picking up" from where the 1927 agreement left off as far as the Malaysia–Singapore border is concerned. In 2018, Malaysia published in its Federal Government Gazette changes to the Johor Bahru port limits that extrapolated from the 1995 territorial waters agreement. Malaysia's Marine Department further issued a Notice to Mariners detailing the changes in the port limits. The unilateral move drew a strong protest from Singapore's Maritime and Port Authority (MPA) who asked the mariners to ignore that notice. Singapore's Ministry of Transport (MOT) added in a statement that Malaysia was "encroaching into Singapore's territorial waters off Tuas".

Western segment

According to the 1979 map, on the western entrance to the Straits of Johor, the border starts at "Point 21", which lies near the western terminus of the border as defined by the 1927 agreement and the terminus of the border agreed to in the 1995 agreement (known as Point W25). The Malaysian border then extends southwards until "Point 17" where it then goes northeasterly till it meets the southern terminus of the Indonesia-Malaysia border delimited by the Indonesia-Malaysia continental shelf boundary agreement of 1969 and the Indonesia-Malaysia territorial waters agreement of 1971. The border between Malaysia and Singapore only runs between "Point 21" and "Point 15" where it should intersect the Indonesia-Singapore maritime border. The meeting point of the maritime territories of the three countries has not been determined.

| Point | Longitude (E) | Latitude (N) | Remarks |
Turning points along the continuation of Malaysia's maritime border to the west of Singapore as in its 1979 map
| 15 | 103° 22'.8 | 1° 15'.0 | Same as Point 10 (southern terminus) of the continental shelf boundary and Point 8 of the territorial sea boundary |
| 16 | 103° 26'.8 | 1° 13'.45 | This turning point may form part of the Indonesia-Malaysia border |
| 17 | 103° 32'.5 | 1° 1'.45 | This turning point may form part of the Indonesia-Malaysia border |
| 18 | 103° 34'.2 | 1° 11'.0 | This turning point may form part of the Indonesia-Malaysia border |
| 19 | 103° 34'.95 | 1° 15'.15 | |
| 20 | 103° 37'.38 | 1° 16'.37 | |
| 21 | 103° 36'.1 | 1° 15'.85 | This point lies close but does not correspond with Point W25 of the 1995 territorial waters agreement |

Eastern segment

The eastern continuation of the territorial waters border defined by the 1979 Malaysian map starts near the eastern terminus of the 1927 agreement border at "Point 22", whereby it goes westwards towards Singapore to "Point 23" before travelling southeasterly towards its southmost point at "Point 27". It then continues in a general easterly direction to meet the southern terminus of the Indonesia-Malaysia border as defined by their continental shelf boundary agreement of 1969. The Indonesia-Singapore border should intersect this boundary at some point but the meeting point of the maritime territories of the three countries has not been determined.

| Point | Longitude (E) | Latitude (N) | Remarks |
Turning point coordinates along the continuation of Malaysia's maritime border to the east of Singapore as in its 1979 map
| 22 | 104° 7'.5 | 1° 17'.63 | This point lies close but does not correspond with Point E47 of the 1995 territorial waters agreement |
| 23 | 104° 2'.5 | 1° 17'.42 | This turning point may form part of the Indonesia-Malaysia border |
| 24 | 104° 4'.6 | 1° 17'.3 | This turning point may form part of the Indonesia-Malaysia border |
| 25 | 104° 7'.1 | 1° 16'.2 | This turning point may form part of the Indonesia-Malaysia border |
| 26 | 104° 7'.42 | 1° 15'.65 | This turning point may form part of the Indonesia-Malaysia border |
| 27 | 104° 12'.67 | 1° 13'.65 | This turning point may form part of the Indonesia-Malaysia border |
| 28 | 104° 16'.15 | 1° 16'.2 | This turning point may form part of the Indonesia-Malaysia border |
| 29 | 104° 19'.8 | 1° 16'.5 | This turning point may form part of the Indonesia-Malaysia border |
| 30 | 104° 29'.45 | 1° 15'.55 | This turning point may form part of the Indonesia-Malaysia border |
| 31 | 104° 29'.33 | 1° 16'.95 | This turning point may form part of the Indonesia-Malaysia border |
| 32 | 104° 29'.5 | 1° 23'.9 | This point is the same as Point 11 (southern terminus) of the 1969 Indonesia-Malaysia continental shelf boundary |

Malaysia's maritime boundary in its 1979 map is not recognised by Singapore and Singapore disputes many parts of the territorial sea and continental shelf claimed by Malaysia. Among them is a slice of territorial waters called the "Point 20 sliver" (see below), and previously, the sovereignty of Pulau Batu Puteh/Pedra Branca which lies within the 12-nautical-mile (22 km) territorial waters claimed by Malaysia but has since been decided by the International Court of Justice in Singapore's favour.

With the award to Singapore of the sovereignty of the island, further determination of the maritime boundary between the two countries as well as with Indonesia whose territorial waters are also in the area, would have to be done to fill in the various gaps and determine the tripoints.

The area around Pedra Branca is expected to be complicated. Pedra Branca lies beyond the three nautical mile (6 km) zone claimed by Singapore but within the 12-nautical-mile (22 km) zone claimed by Malaysia. Singapore has indicated that the Indonesia-Singapore and Malaysia–Singapore borders in this area would not run continuously from the waters adjacent to the main Singapore island to the Pedra Branca area and a stretch of the Indonesia-Malaysia border would lie in between. Further complications could arise by the awarding of Middle Rocks, which lies 0.6 nautical miles (1.5 km) south of Pedra Branca (i.e. away from the Johor coast), to Malaysia. A joint technical committee has been formed to determine the maritime border.

== History ==
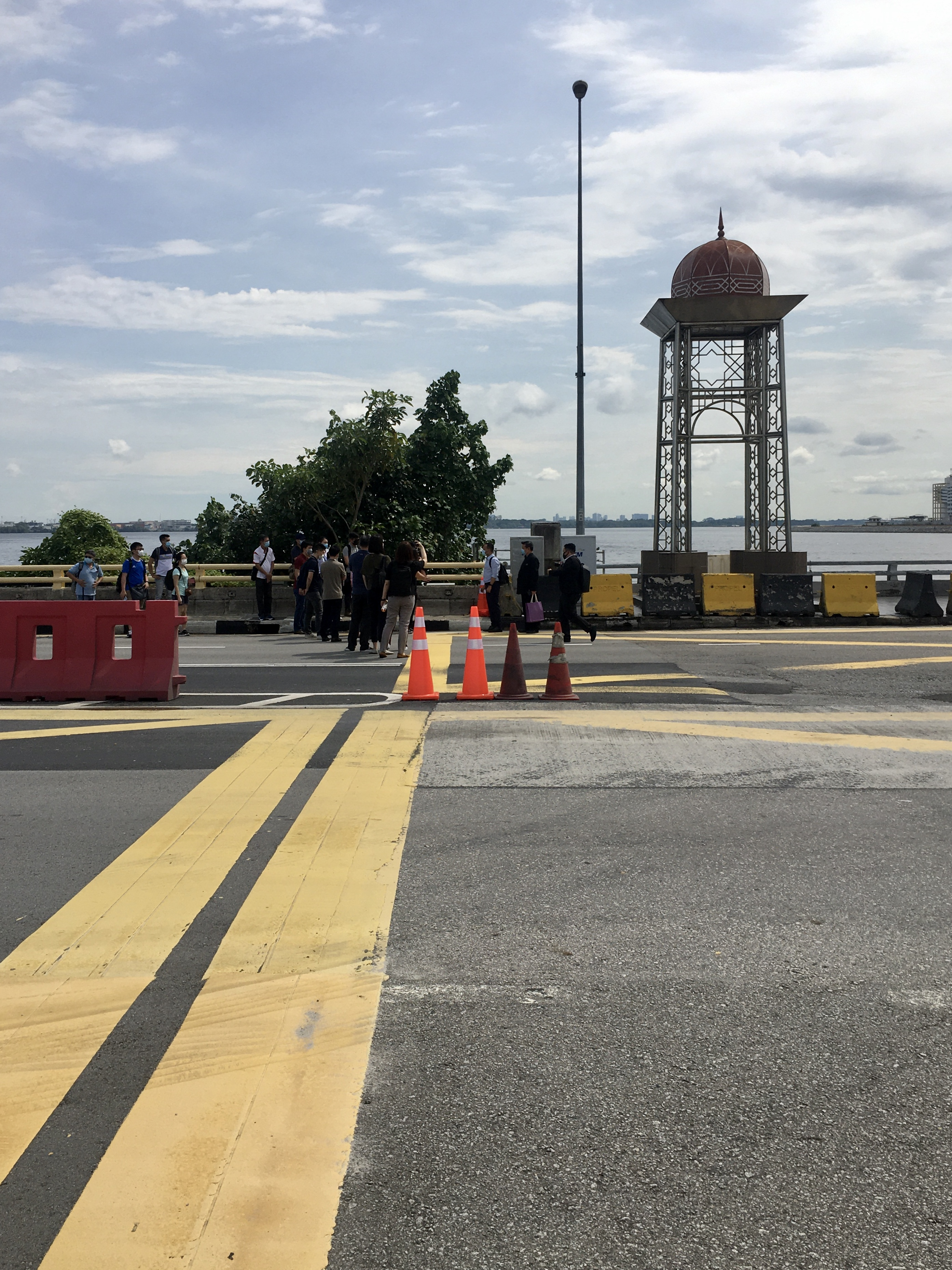
The demarcation line between Singapore (left) and Malaysia (right)

The modern border between Malaysia and Singapore came into existence in 1824 when the island of Singapore was ceded by the Johor Sultanate to the British East India Company. In 1914 Johor became a formal British protectorate, however Singapore remained separate, part of the Straits Settlements. On 19 October 1927 Governor Hugh Clifford of the Straits Settlements and Sultan Ibrahim of Johor signed a treaty defining a maritime border, which led to the Straits Settlements and Johore Territorial Waters (Agreement) Act of 1928.

On 31 August 1957, the Federation of Malaya, which included Johor, became independent and the Johor–Singapore border became an international border between Malaya and Singapore. On 16 September 1963, Malaya and Singapore merged into Malaysia, rendering the border between two component states of Malaysia. The border again became an international border when Singapore was expelled from Malaysia on 9 August 1965, becoming independent.

On 7 August 1995 the two countries signed the Agreement Between the Government of Malaysia and the Government of the Republic of Singapore to Delimit Precisely the Territorial Waters Boundary in Accordance with the Straits Settlement and Johore Territorial Waters Agreement 1927, precisely delineating the border along the thalweg of the Straits of Johor. This border is formed from 72 straight line segments.

=== COVID-19 pandemic ===
On 16 March 2020, both the Malaysian and Singaporean governments announced that both Malaysia and Singapore would implement border restrictions in response to the COVID-19 pandemic. This border closure would last for approximately two years, with exceptions given for cargo goods.

On 1 April 2022, Malaysian Prime Minister Ismail Sabri Yaakob and Singaporean Prime Minister Lee Hsien Loong both announced that two countries' borders had officially reopened as COVID-19 Omicron cases had declined in both countries. Two years after the full closure, the Causeway and Second Link were finally reopened at both sides to all forms of private transportation. Travellers had to be fully vaccinated, while unvaccinated children under the age of 12 was to be accompanied by a fully-vaccinated guardian. Travellers can cross the Malaysia–Singapore border for the purposes of family, business, and recreational trips. Since 2023, the flow of cargo, goods, and food supplies has returned to normal levels seen prior to the pandemic.

== Disputes ==
Malaysian and Singaporean governments have been involved in a range of disputes and disagreements which had tested the bilateral relations between the two countries. Most of these, including that over Keretapi Tanah Melayu, or Malayan Railway, land in Singapore, are not territorial or border disputes as they do not involve questions of sovereignty over territory or territorial waters.

There have, however, been two disputes concerning sovereignty of territory along the Malaysia–Singapore border. The more well-known one is that over Pedra Branca, which the International Court of Justice decided in Singapore's favour on 23 May 2008. Another case arose from a "complaint" by Malaysia over reclamation carried out by Singapore at territorial waters adjacent to the border with Malaysia. The dispute was submitted to the International Tribunal for the Law of the Sea in Hamburg by Malaysia on 4 September 2003.

=== Sovereignty of Pedra Branca ===
Pedra Branca is a rock formation located at the eastern entrance to the Singapore Straits to the southeast of the southeastern tip of Johor, Malaysia. Together with two other marine features called Middle Rocks and South Ledge, they were subject to a sovereignty dispute between Malaysia and Singapore.

On 23 May 2008, the International Court of Justice decided that Singapore had sovereignty over Pedra Branca while Malaysia had sovereignty over Middle Rocks. It left the question of sovereignty over South Ledge, which only appears during low tide, to be determined later by stating that its sovereignty would depend on whose territorial waters it was located in. The decision settles a long-standing barrier to the negotiation process for the determination of the maritime boundary between the two countries and both Malaysia and Singapore said immediately after the ICJ decision that a joint technical committee would be set up to determine the maritime border in the waters around Pedra Branca.

Malaysia filed a review before the 10 year mark of the award in 2017, the review was subsequently withdrawn in 2018 by the new government putting the matter to rest.

=== Singaporean land reclamation case ===
This dispute resulted from Singapore's reclaiming of land in two areas, namely in the southwestern end of the island called the Tuas development, and in the waters adjacent to Pulau Tekong in the Straits of Johor. The latter does not involve any encroachment into the territorial waters of Malaysia, and Malaysia merely argued that the reclamation works would affect the environment of the Straits of Johor as a shared waterway.

The Tuas development, however, can be deemed a case of territorial dispute as Malaysia claims the reclamation works has encroached into its territorial waters in an area called the "Point 20 sliver". The "sliver", regarded as an anomaly by Singapore, arises as a result of the unilateral declaration of Malaysia's territorial waters boundary as defined by a 1979 map published by Malaysia where, between turning points No 19 and No 21, Point 20 strikes out to the east of the general continental shelf boundary towards Singapore, thus forming a triangle of Malaysian territorial waters extending eastwards from the general north–south territorial waters boundary. The Tuas development reclamation project encroaches into this sliver of territorial waters. Singapore does not recognise the 1979 continental shelf boundary and, thus, does not recognise the "point 20 sliver" as under Malaysian sovereignty.

In 2003, Malaysia submitted a case to the International Tribunal for the Law of the Sea and requested for provisional measures against Singapore's reclamation works, including that concerning Point 20. On 8 October 2003, the tribunal decided that:

Malaysia has not shown that there is a situation of urgency or that there is a risk that its rights with respect to an area of its territorial sea would suffer irreversible damage pending consideration of the merits of the case by the arbitral tribunal. Therefore, the Tribunal does not consider it appropriate to prescribe provisional measures with respect to the land reclamation by Singapore in the sector of Tuas.

The other parts of the order covered the issue of land reclamation around Pulau Tekong, whereby the tribunal ordered the two countries to jointly establish a group of independent experts to come up with a report "within a period not exceeding one year from the date of this Order, the effects of Singapore's land reclamation and to propose, as appropriate, measures to deal with any adverse effects of such land reclamation."

After a 13-month study, the group of experts reported that of 57 impacts identified, 40 could only be detected in a computer model but not likely to be detectable out in the field, while the remaining 17 impacts could be eliminated via prescribed mitigating measures. Singapore's Agent Professor Tommy Koh said, "The happy news, of course, is that the two delegations were able to agree on the appropriate way in which these recommendations would be implemented", which allowed both countries to come to an amicable solution which resulted in the termination of the arbitration proceedings. The Settlement Agreement was signed by both countries on 26 April 2005.

As for the Point 20 issue, which was not specifically touched on by the group of experts as it concerned the issue of delimitation of the Malaysia-Singapore maritime boundary, the two countries reached an agreement not to deal with the issue in this negotiation.

"We both agreed that this will be taken up subsequently, in other negotiations. In the meantime, both sides recognise that neither side has given up any rights they have under international law or their right to resort to other peaceful means of settling this outstanding dispute."

== Border crossings ==
More than 450,000 people cross the Malaysia–Singapore border every day, using the two land crossings across the Straits of Johor. This makes it one of the busiest land borders in the world.

Record progression of the number of travellers crossing the land border
| Date | Travellers | Note | Ref |
|---|---|---|---|
| 4 Sep 2026 | 599,000 | September school holidays (SG) | |
| 19 Jun 2026 | 598,000 | June school holidays (SG) | |
| 19 Dec 2025 | 588,000 | December school holidays (SG/MY) | |
| 20 Jun 2025 | 578,000 | June school holidays (SG) | |
| 20 Dec 2024 | 562,000 | December school holidays (SG/MY) | |
| 13 Dec 2024 | 553,000 | December school holidays (SG/MY) | |
| 6 Sep 2024 | 543,000 | September school holidays (SG) | |
| 8 Aug 2024 | 540,000 | National Day long weekend (SG) | |
| 14 Jun 2024 | 530,000 | June school holidays (SG) and Hari Raya Haji long weekend (SG/MY) | |
| 13 Jun 2024 | 510,000 | June school holidays (SG) and Hari Raya Haji long weekend (SG/MY) | |
| 28 Mar 2024 | 510,000 | Good Friday long weekend (SG) | |
| 15 Mar 2024 | 500,000 | March school holidays (SG) | |
| 8 Mar 2024 | 495,000 | March school holidays (SG) | |
| 8 Aug 2019 | 485,000 | National Day long weekend (SG) | |

- Johor–Singapore Causeway

to the north of Singapore, the busiest border checkpoint in the world with 350,000 travellers daily.

- Malaysia–Singapore Second Link

to the west of Singapore, known officially as Tuas Second Link in Singapore or Linkedua in Malaysia.

- There is also a sea crossing between Pengerang in Johor and Changi in Singapore.

=== Johor–Singapore Causeway ===
The Johor–Singapore Causeway is most used link between the two countries. It supports road and railway. It is the oldest physical link between the countries and was completed in 1923. Checkpoints for identity card checks were set up in 1966. Passport checks began in 1967.

There are different checkpoints for road and rail travellers respectively. Road travellers are processed at the Sultan Iskandar Complex on the Malaysian side, and Woodlands Checkpoint on the Singaporean side. Both immigration checkpoints replaced older facilities; the current Woodlands Checkpoint started operations in 1998, while the Sultan Iskandar Complex opened in 2008.

==== Railway crossing ====
The Malaysian railway operator, Keretapi Tanah Melayu (KTM), formerly ran an extensive intercity railway service from Singapore. Rail travellers are processed at the Woodlands Train Checkpoint (WTCP), which is separated from the Woodlands Checkpoint used by road travellers. Since 1 July 2011, WTCP was the southern terminus of the KTM rail network and the checkpoint houses both Malaysian and Singaporean border control facilities.

For decades, Tanjong Pagar railway station in downtown Singapore served as the southern terminus of the KTM rail network, with the railway land and the station under Malaysian ownership. Before 1998, both Malaysian and Singaporean border control facilities were co-located at the station. In 1998, Singapore opened the Woodlands Train Checkpoint and moved its immigration post there, the official reason being improving border security. However, Malaysia refused to move its immigration post to the WTCP or Johor Bahru, citing the move as a ploy to force Malaysia to hand over the railway land and the station as per the Malaysia–Singapore Points of Agreement of 1990, which the two countries interpret differently. Between 1998 and 2011, the border clearance for passengers travelling towards Malaysia was an anomaly, as they were granted entry to Malaysia at Tanjong Pagar railway station before passing through Singapore exit controls at WTCP. Passengers travelling to Singapore were not affected as they were already cleared by Malaysian authorities at Johor Bahru railway station before Singapore border control at WTCP. The dispute was resolved in 2010, with Malaysia relocating its immigration post to WTCP and handing over the railway land and also Tanjong Pagar railway station on 1 July 2011, in exchange for joint development of prime land in Singapore. Since 2015, KTM's only service into Singapore has been the Shuttle Tebrau between WTCP and Johor Bahru Sentral stations. In 2027, after the commencement of the new Johor Bahru–Singapore Rapid Transit System (RTS), WTCP will close, marking the complete withdrawal of KTM from Singapore.

=== Malaysia–Singapore Second Link ===
The Second Link as the name suggests is the second road border crossing between the two countries. It connects Tuas on the Singapore side to Tanjung Kupang on the Malaysia side. It was completed and opened to traffic on 2 January 1998. The checkpoints are:

- Malaysia – Sultan Abu Bakar Complex
- Singapore – Tuas Checkpoint

=== Sea crossings ===
There are two sea crossings between Malaysia and Singapore. Changi Point, near Changi Village, has had an immigration post since November 1967, and hosts regular ferry services to Pengerang in southeastern Johor.

Tanah Merah Ferry Terminal, which previously only hosted ferries to Indonesia, began hosting services to the newly-built Desaru Ferry Terminal on July 7, 2022.

== See also ==
- Indonesia–Malaysia border
- Indonesia–Singapore border
- Pedra Branca, Singapore
