= Pedra Branca dispute =

Resolved territorial dispute in Asia

Coordinates: 1°19′49″N 104°24′21″E

Sovereignty over Pedra Branca/Pulau Batu Puteh, Middle Rocks and South Ledge (Malaysia v. Singapore)
- Court: International Court of Justice
- Decided: 23 May 2008
- Citation: General List No. 130
- Transcript: Written proceedings

Court membership
- Judges sitting: Awn Shawkat Al-Khasawneh, Raymond Ranjeva, Shi Jiuyong, Abdul G. Koroma, Gonzalo Parra Aranguren, Thomas Buergenthal, Hisashi Owada, Bruno Simma, Peter Tomka, Ronny Abraham, Kenneth Keith, Bernardo Sepúlveda Amor, Mohamed Bennouna, Leonid Skotnikov, Pemmaraju Sreenivasa Rao (ad hoc judge appointed by Singapore) and John Dugard (ad hoc judge appointed by Malaysia)

Case opinions
- Singapore has sovereignty over Pedra Branca; Malaysia has sovereignty over Middle Rocks; country in whose territorial waters South Ledge is located has sovereignty over that maritime feature

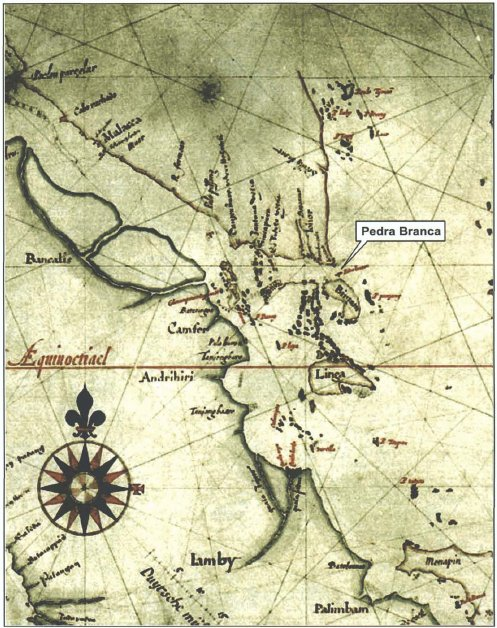
Detail of a 1620 "Map of Sumatra" by Hessel Gerritz, a cartographer with the Hydrographic Service of the Dutch East India Company. The location of the island of "Pedrablanca" (Pedra Branca) is marked.

The Pedra Branca dispute was a territorial dispute between Singapore and Malaysia over several islets at the eastern entrance to the Singapore Strait, namely Pedra Branca (previously called Pulau Batu Puteh and now Batu Puteh by Malaysia), Middle Rocks and South Ledge. The dispute began in 1979 and was largely resolved by the International Court of Justice (ICJ) in 2008, which opined that Pedra Branca belonged to Singapore and Middle Rocks belonged to Malaysia. Sovereignty over South Ledge belongs to the state in the territorial waters of which it is located.

In early 1980, Singapore lodged a formal protest with Malaysia in response to a map published by Malaysia in 1979 claiming Pedra Branca. In 1989 Singapore proposed submitting the dispute to the ICJ. Malaysia agreed to this in 1994. In 1993, Singapore also claimed the nearby islets Middle Rocks and South Ledge. In 1998 the two countries agreed on the text of a Special Agreement that was needed to submit the dispute to the ICJ. The Special Agreement was signed in February 2003, and the ICJ formally notified of the Agreement in July that year. The hearing before the ICJ was held over three weeks in November 2007 under the name Sovereignty over Pedra Branca/Pulau Batu Puteh, Middle Rocks and South Ledge (Malaysia v. Singapore).

Singapore argued that Pedra Branca was terra nullius, and that there was no evidence the island had ever been under the sovereignty of the Johor Sultanate. In the event the Court did not accept this argument, Singapore contended that sovereignty over the island had passed to Singapore due to the consistent exercise of authority over the island by Singapore and its predecessor, the United Kingdom. The actions taken included selecting Pedra Branca as the site for Horsburgh Lighthouse and constructing the lighthouse, requiring Malaysian officials wishing to visit the island to obtain permits, installing a military rebroadcast station on the island, and studying the feasibility of reclaiming land around the island. Malaysia had remained silent in the face of these activities. In addition, it had confirmed in a 1953 letter that Johor did not claim ownership of the island, and had published official reports and maps indicating that it regarded Pedra Branca as Singapore territory. Middle Rocks and South Ledge should be regarded as dependencies of Pedra Branca.

Malaysia's case was that Johor had original title to Pedra Branca, Middle Rocks and South Ledge. Johor had not ceded Pedra Branca to the United Kingdom, but had merely granted permission for the lighthouse to be built and maintained on it. The actions of the United Kingdom and Singapore in respect of the Horsburgh Lighthouse and the waters surrounding the island were not actions of the island's sovereign. Further, the 1953 letter had been unauthorised and the official reports and maps it had issued were either irrelevant or inconclusive.

On 23 May 2008, the Court ruled that Pedra Branca is under Singapore's sovereignty, while Middle Rocks belongs to Malaysia. As regards South Ledge, the Court noted that it falls within the apparently overlapping territorial waters generated by mainland Malaysia, Pedra Branca and Middle Rocks. As it is a maritime feature visible only at low tide, it belongs to the state in the territorial waters of which it is located. Malaysia and Singapore have established what they have named the Joint Technical Committee to delimit the maritime boundary in the area around Pedra Branca and Middle Rocks, and to determine the ownership of South Ledge.

== Dispute ==
Pedra Branca is a small granite outcrop located 25 nautical miles (46 km; 29 mi) east of Singapore and 7.7 nautical miles (14.3 km; 8.9 mi) south of Johor, Malaysia, where the Singapore Strait meets the South China Sea. There are two maritime features near the island: Middle Rocks, 0.6 nautical miles (1.1 km; 0.69 mi) south of Pedra Branca, which consists of two clusters of small rocks about 250 metres (820 ft) apart; and South Ledge, 2.2 nautical miles (4.1 km; 2.5 mi) south-south-west of Pedra Branca, which is visible only at low tide.

Singapore has been administering Pedra Branca since Horsburgh Lighthouse was built on the island by its predecessor, the United Kingdom, between 1850 and 1851. Singapore was ceded by Sultan Hussein Shah and Temenggung Abdul Rahman Sri Maharajah of Johor to the British East India Company under a Treaty of Friendship and Alliance of 2 August 1824 (the Crawfurd Treaty), and became part of the Straits Settlements in 1826. At the time when the lighthouse on the island was constructed, the Straits Settlements were under British rule through the Government of India.

On 21 December 1979, the Director of National Mapping of Malaysia published a map entitled Territorial Waters and Continental Shelf Boundaries of Malaysia showing Pedra Branca to be within its territorial waters. Singapore rejected this "claim" in a diplomatic note of 14 February 1980 and asked for the map to be corrected. In the late 1980s, Attorney-General of Singapore Tan Boon Teik was despatched by the Prime Minister of Singapore Lee Kuan Yew to disclose the documentary evidence which Singapore had to the Malaysian Attorney-General, to demonstrate the strength of Singapore's case. However, the dispute was not resolved by an exchange of correspondence and intergovernmental talks in 1993 and 1994. In the first round of talks in February 1993 the issue of sovereignty over Middle Rocks and South Ledge was also raised. Malaysia and Singapore therefore agreed to submit the dispute to the International Court of Justice (ICJ).

== Procedural matters ==
The approximate location of Pedra Branca in the South China Sea in relation to the countries surrounding it

Singapore first suggested submitting the territorial dispute to the ICJ in 1989. The suggestion was accepted by Malaysia in 1994. In 1998, the text of a Special Agreement to bring the matter before the ICJ was agreed, and the Agreement was signed by the two countries at Putrajaya, Malaysia, on 6 February 2003. It was notified to the Court in July 2003. The case was assigned the name Sovereignty over Pedra Branca/Pulau Batu Puteh, Middle Rocks and South Ledge (Malaysia v. Singapore).

Following directions issued by the Court, the parties exchanged memorials on 25 March 2004, counter-memorials on 25 January 2005, and replies on 25 November 2005. As the parties informed the Court by a letter dated 23 January 2006 that rejoinders were unnecessary, the written proceedings were closed. The Court determined by drawing lots that Singapore would present its case first. Public hearings were held between 6 and 23 November 2007, with Singapore presenting its case from 6 to 9 November, and Malaysia doing the same from 13 to 16 November 2007. Each country was then given two days to respond, with 19 and 20 November allocated to Singapore, and 22 and 23 November allocated to Malaysia. The persons who spoke for the parties were:

- For Singapore:
  - Tommy Koh, Ambassador-at-Large, Ministry of Foreign Affairs (Singapore); Professor of Law at the National University of Singapore (acting as Singapore's Agent);
  - Chao Hick Tin, Attorney-General of Singapore (Counsel and Advocate);
  - Chan Sek Keong, Chief Justice of Singapore (Counsel and Advocate);
  - Alain Pellet, Professor at the Paris X University Nanterre; member and former Chairman of the United Nations International Law Commission; associate member of the Institut de Droit International (Counsel and Advocate);
  - Ian Brownlie, C.B.E., Q.C., F.B.A.; member of the English Bar; Chairman of the UN International Law Commission; Emeritus Chichele Professor of Public International Law, University of Oxford; member of the Institut de Droit International; Distinguished Fellow, All Souls College, Oxford (Counsel and Advocate);
  - Rodman R. Bundy, avocat à la Cour d'Appel de Paris; member of the New York State Bar Association; Frere Cholmeley/Eversheds, Paris (Counsel and Advocate);
  - Loretta Malintoppi, avocat à la Cour d'Appel de Paris; member of the Rome Bar; Frere Cholmeley/Eversheds, Paris (Counsel and Advocate); and
  - S. Jayakumar, Deputy Prime Minister; Co-ordinating Minister for National Security and Minister for Law; Professor of Law at the National University of Singapore (Counsel and Advocate).
- For Malaysia:
  - Abdul Kadir Mohamad, Ambassador-at-Large, Ministry of Foreign Affairs, Malaysia; Adviser for Foreign Affairs to the Prime Minister (Malaysia's Agent);
  - Farida Ariffin, Ambassador of Malaysia to the Netherlands (Co-Agent);
  - Abdul Gani Patail, Attorney-General of Malaysia (Counsel);
  - Elihu Lauterpacht, C.B.E., Q.C., Honorary Professor of International Law, University of Cambridge; member of the Institut de Droit International; member of the Permanent Court of Arbitration (Counsel);
  - James Crawford, S.C., F.B.A., Whewell Professor of International Law, University of Cambridge; member of the Institut de Droit International (Counsel);
  - Nicolaas Jan Schrijver, Professor of Public International Law, Leiden University; associate member of the Institut de Droit International (Counsel);
  - Marcelo Kohen, Professor of International Law, Graduate Institute of International Studies, Geneva; associate member of the Institut de Droit International (Counsel); and
  - Penelope Nevill, college lecturer, Downing College, Cambridge.

The case was presided over by ICJ Vice-President Judge Awn Shawkat Al-Khasawneh, alongside 13 other judges and two ad hoc judges appointed by the two countries. The judges were Raymond Ranjeva from Madagascar, Shi Jiuyong from the People's Republic of China, Abdul G. Koroma from Sierra Leone, Gonzalo Parra Aranguren from Venezuela, Thomas Buergenthal from the United States, Hisashi Owada from Japan, Bruno Simma from Germany, Peter Tomka from Slovakia, Ronny Abraham from France, Kenneth Keith from New Zealand, Bernardo Sepúlveda Amor from Mexico, Mohamed Bennouna from Morocco and Leonid Skotnikov from Russia. As the Bench of the Court did not include any judges of the nationality of either party, the parties exercised their right to choose judges ad hoc to sit in the case. Singapore appointed Pemmaraju Sreenivasa Rao from India, and Malaysia Christopher John Robert Dugard from South Africa.

== Singapore's case ==
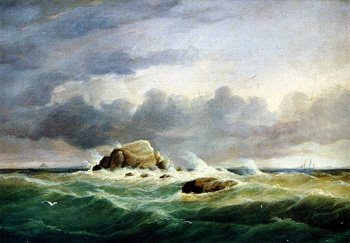
An 1882 painting of Pedra Branca before Horsburgh Lighthouse was built upon it. It is believed that John Turnbull Thomson commissioned the artist, Captain Thomas Robertson, to produce the painting based on an 1850 sketch by Thomson.

=== Pedra Branca terra nullius ===
Singapore argued that in 1847 Pedra Branca was terra nullius (Latin for "land belonging to no one") as it had never been the subject of a prior claim or manifestation of sovereignty by any sovereign entity. It denied Malaysia's claim that the island had been under Johor's sovereignty. It contended there was no evidence that the Johor Sultanate had claimed or exercised authority over Pedra Branca between 1512 and 1641. This period began with the fall of the Malacca Sultanate to the Portuguese in 1512, who continued to harass the Johor Sultanate during this time, as did the Aceh Sultanate. Similarly, there was no evidence of Johor's sovereignty over Pedra Branca between 1641 and 1699, when Johor's power and influence were at their height; between 1699 and 1784 when the death of Sultan Mahmud Shah II in 1699 without a clear heir led to instability, during which many vassals broke away from the Sultanate; and between 1784 and 1824 when, according to a 1949 annual report of the Johor government, the Sultanate was in a "state of dissolution" by the beginning of the 19th century.

To support its assertion that the Sultan of Johor did not have sovereignty over Pedra Branca, Singapore contended that the traditional Malay concept of sovereignty was based mainly on control over people and not over territory. Thus, the only reliable way to determine whether a particular territory belonged to a ruler was to find out whether the inhabitants pledged allegiance to that ruler. This was difficult to do with respect to Pedra Branca since it was isolated and uninhabited, and Malaysia had not provided clear evidence of a direct claim to or actual exercise of sovereign authority over the island.

In addition, Singapore claimed that the old Johor Sultanate, which controlled a maritime Malay empire from a capital on the Johor River, was not the same as the new Johor Sultanate occupying only the southern tip of the Malay Peninsula that came into existence after the signing of the Anglo–Dutch Treaty of 1824 between the United Kingdom and the Netherlands. In its view, the Anglo–Dutch Treaty did not divide up the Singapore Strait, in which Pedra Branca is situated, between the new Johor Sultanate under the British sphere of influence and the Riau-Lingga Sultanate under Dutch influence. Instead, both Britain and the Netherlands could access the Strait freely. Therefore, there was a legal vacuum with regard to sovereignty over the island, enabling the British to lawfully take possession of it between 1847 and 1851.

Following the death of Sultan Mahmud Shah III of Johor in 1812, his two sons Hussein and Abdul Rahman vied for the throne of the Johor Sultanate. The United Kingdom recognised the elder son Hussein, who was based in Singapore, as the rightful heir, while the Netherlands recognised the younger son Abdul Rahman who was based in Riau (now Bintan, Indonesia). A year after the Anglo–Dutch Treaty, Abdul Rahman sent a letter dated 25 June 1825 to Hussein. In it he stated that, "in complete agreement with the spirit and the content of the treaty concluded between their Majesties, the Kings of the Netherlands and Great Britain", he donated to his older brother "[t]he part of the lands assigned to [Great Britain]":

Your territory, thus, extends over Johor and Pahang on the mainland or on the Malay Peninsula. The territory of Your Brother [Abdul Rahman] extends out over the islands of Lingga, Bintan, Galang, Bulan, Karimon and all other islands. Whatsoever may be in the sea, this is the territory of Your Brother, and whatever is situated on the mainland is yours.

On the basis of this letter, Singapore argued that Abdul Rahman had only donated the mainland territories to Hussein and had retained sovereignty over all the islands in the sea. Pedra Branca therefore never became a part of Johor.

=== Lawful taking of ownership ===
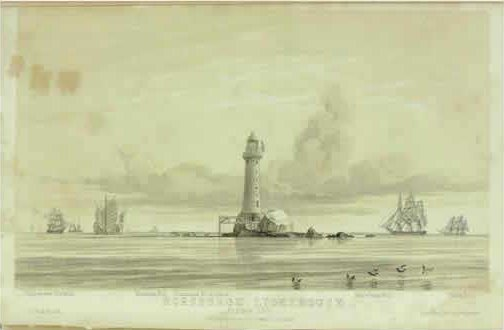
Horsburgh Lighthouse, a painting by John Turnbull Thomson showing the island of Pedra Branca in 1851 just after the completion of the lighthouse he designed

In the event that the Court rejected the argument that Pedra Branca was terra nullius in 1847, Singapore contended that the selection of Pedra Branca as the site for Horsburgh Lighthouse and the construction of the lighthouse between 1847 and 1851 constituted a taking of possession of the island à titre de souverain (with the title of a sovereign). The British Crown obtained title over the island in accordance with legal principles governing the acquisition of territory at that time. This title was maintained by the United Kingdom and its lawful successor, the Republic of Singapore.

Singapore claimed that it and its predecessor the United Kingdom had demonstrated a consistent exercise of authority over the island through various acts since 1847. For instance, during the ceremony for the laying of the foundation stone of the lighthouse on 24 May 1850, Pedra Branca was described as a "dependency of Singapore" in the presence of the Governor of the Straits Settlements – the most senior British official in Singapore – and other British and foreign officials. The attribution of sovereignty was widely reported in local newspapers, but drew no response from the Johor authorities. Other significant acts included the following:

- Singapore had investigated shipwrecks in the waters around the island between 1920 and 1979.
- It had exercised exclusive control over the use of the island and visits to the island, including requiring Malaysian officials wishing to visit the island for scientific surveys to obtain permits.
- It had displayed British and Singapore ensigns from Horsburgh Lighthouse. Furthermore, it had acceded to a request by Malaysia in 1968 to remove the Singapore flag from another island, Pulau Pisang, which is under Malaysian sovereignty. Malaysia had made no such request in respect of Pedra Branca.
- On 30 May 1977, the Port of Singapore Authority (PSA) allowed the Republic of Singapore Navy to install a military rebroadcast station on the island.
- On the direction of the Government of Singapore, in 1972, 1973, 1974 and 1978 the PSA studied the feasibility of reclaiming 5,000 square metres (54,000 sq ft) of land around the island. Tenders for the project were sought through newspaper advertisements, though eventually the project was not proceeded with.

In addition, Singapore had on two occasions claimed the sea around Pedra Branca as its territorial waters. The first occasion was in July 1952 when the Chief Surveyor expressed the opinion that Singapore should claim a 3-mile (4.8 km) limit around the island. Subsequently, in 1967, the Singapore Government's Marine Department also stated in an official memorandum to the Ministry of Foreign Affairs (Singapore) that the waters within three miles of Pedra Branca might be considered Singapore territorial waters.

=== Malaysia's inaction and acceptance of Singapore's sovereignty ===
21 September 1953 letter from the Acting State Secretary of Johor to the Colonial Secretary of Singapore indicating that Johor "does not claim ownership of Pedra Branca".

It was also Singapore's case that for over 130 years since 1847, Malaysia had been silent over Singapore's activities and exercise of sovereignty over Pedra Branca. No other state had challenged Singapore's claims, and Singapore had made them without having to seek approval from any other state. During the hearing, Ambassador-at-Large Tommy Koh highlighted this by saying:

A key feature of this case is the constant stream of Singapore's acts of administration in relation to Pedra Branca, contrasted with the complete absence of Malaysian activities on Pedra Branca or within its territorial waters, and with Malaysia's silence in the face of all these state activities of Singapore ... Such silence on Malaysia's part is significant and must be taken to mean that Malaysia never regarded Pedra Branca as her territory.

On 12 June 1953, when Singapore was a Crown Colony, its Colonial Secretary J. D. Higham wrote to the British Adviser to the Sultan of Johor to clarify the status of Pedra Branca. He noted that the rock was outside the limits ceded by Sultan Hussein Shah and the Temenggung with the island of Singapore under the 1824 Crawfurd Treaty they had entered into with the East India Company. However, the Colonial Government had been maintaining the lighthouse built on it, and "[t]his by international usage no doubt confers some rights and obligations on the Colony". He therefore asked if "there is any document showing a lease or grant of the rock or whether it has been ceded by the Government of the State of Johore or in any other way disposed of". The Acting State Secretary of Johor, M. Seth bin Saaid, replied on 21 September that "the Johore Government does not claim ownership of Pedra Branca". Singapore contended that this reply confirmed Singapore's sovereignty over the island and that Johor had no title, historic or otherwise, to it.

The Colony of Singapore became a self-governing state in 1959, and left the British Empire to join the Federation of Malaysia in 1963. Two years later, in 1965, Singapore became a fully independent Commonwealth republic. In 1959, in an official publication regarding meteorological information collected on Pedra Branca, Malaya listed Horsburgh Lighthouse as a "Singapore" station together with the Sultan Shoal and Raffles Lighthouses. The lighthouse on Pedra Branca was described in the same way in a joint Malaysian and Singaporean publication in 1966, the year after Singapore left the Federation. In 1967, when the two countries began reporting meteorological information separately, Malaysia ceased referring to Horsburgh Lighthouse. In maps published by the Malayan and Malaysian Surveyor General and Director of General Mapping in 1962, 1965, 1970, 1974 and 1975, the island was indicated with the word "(SINGAPORE)" or "(SINGAPURA)" under it. The same designation was used for an island that was unquestionably under Singapore's sovereignty. On the other hand, the designation was not used for Pulau Pisang, an island under Malaysian sovereignty on which Singapore operated a lighthouse.

At a news conference in May 1980, the Malaysian leader admitted that the question of sovereignty over Pedra Branca was "not very clear" to Malaysia.

On 19 November 2007, Singapore Deputy Prime Minister S. Jayakumar responded to Malaysia's claim that Singapore was attempting to subvert the status quo by claiming sovereignty of Pedra Branca. He stated that Singapore was "an honest, law-abiding state that has never and will never do anything to endanger navigational safety, security arrangements or the Singapore Strait's environment," and that it was Malaysia that had sought to alter the status quo by publishing the map that incited the dispute, which had altered maritime boundaries with seven neighbouring countries. This was evidenced by a telegram that the Malaysian Government had sent to its overseas missions in December 1979, notifying them that the map would "affect" Brunei, China, Indonesia, the Philippines, Thailand, Singapore and Vietnam.

=== Pedra Branca, Middle Rocks and South Ledge one entity ===
Singapore took the position that Pedra Branca, Middle Rocks and South Ledge should be considered a single group of maritime features as Middle Rocks and South Ledge were dependencies of Pedra Branca. It relied, among others, on the Island of Palmas Case (1932): "As regards a group of islands, it is possible that a group may under certain circumstances be regarded as in law a unit, and that the fate of the principal part may involve the rest." It argued that the three maritime features were geomorphologically the same, as rock samples showed that they were all composed of a light, coarse-grained biotite granite. Additionally, Malaysia had not shown any exercise of sovereignty over the uninhabited reefs of Middle Rocks and South Ledge while Singapore had consistently exercised sovereign authority in the surrounding waters. Since sovereignty over Pedra Branca belonged to Singapore, so did sovereignty over Middle Rocks and South Ledge as they were within Pedra Branca's territorial waters.

== Malaysia's case ==
=== Pedra Branca not terra nullius ===
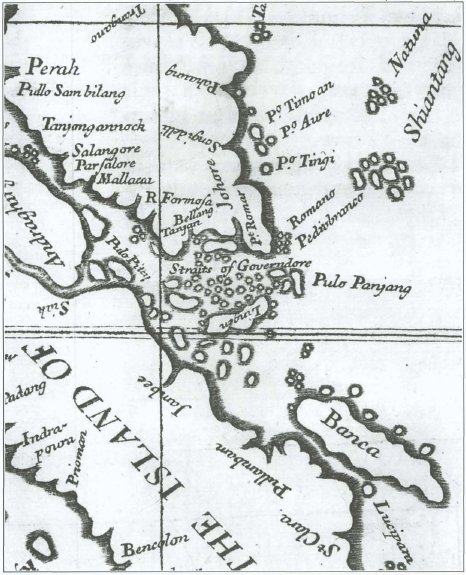
Detail of "A Map of the Dominions of Johore and of the Island of Sumatra with the Adjacent Islands" (1727) by Alexander Hamilton showing the island of "Pedrobranco"

Malaysia's case was that it had original title to Pedra Branca "from time immemorial". The island could not at any relevant time have been terra nullius as it is and had always been part of Johor, which is now a state of Malaysia. Nothing that the United Kingdom or Singapore had done had displaced its sovereignty over it. Contrary to what Singapore had claimed, there had been no break between the old Sultanate of Johor and the new Johor Sultanate ruled by Sultan Hussein that came into existence after the signing of the 1824 Anglo–Dutch Treaty. The Treaty had the effect of leaving the islands south of the Singapore Strait within the Dutch sphere of influence (the Riau–Lingga Sultanate), while the territory and islands in the Strait and to its north were within the British sphere of influence (the new Johor Sultanate). A few months after the conclusion of the Anglo–Dutch Treaty, the Sultan and the Temenggung of Johor entered into the Crawfurd Treaty with the East India Company on 2 August 1824. Article II of the Crawfurd Treaty stated:

Their Highnesses the Sultan Hussein Mahomed Shah and Datu Tumungong Abdul Rahman Sri Maharajah hereby cede in full sovereignty and property to the Honourable the English East India Company, their heirs and successors for ever, the Island of Singapore situated in the Straits of Malacca, together with the adjacent seas, straits, and islets, to the extent of ten geographical miles, from the coast of the said main island of Singapore.

Since Johor could not have ceded Singapore island and the islets in its vicinity to the British if it lacked title to them, this was evidence that the United Kingdom recognised the prior and continuing sovereignty of the Johor Sultanate over all islands in and around the Singapore Strait.

Malaysia challenged Singapore's contention that Pedra Branca never became part of the new Johor Sultanate because 25 June 1825 letter from Sultan Abdul Rahman of Riau–Lingga to Sultan Hussain showed that Abdul Rahman had only donated territories on the mainland of the Malay Peninsula to Hussein and had retained sovereignty over all the islands in the sea. Malaysia submitted Abdul Rahman's statement that his territory "extends out over the islands of Lingga, Bintan, Galang, Bulan, Karimon and all other islands" had to be read in the context of Article XII of the 1824 Anglo–Dutch Treaty, which guaranteed that no "British Establishment" would be made "on the Carimon Isles, or on the Island of Bantam, Bintang, Lingin, or on any of the other Islands South of the Straits of Singapore". Three of the islands mentioned by Abdul Rahman – Bintan, Karimun and Lingga – were islands that the British had agreed were not within their sphere of influence, while the other two – Bulan and Galang – lay south of the Singapore Strait. Therefore, the phrase "all other islands" in Abdul Rahman's letter referred only to islands lying within the Dutch sphere of influence. The letter was simply formal recognition that Abdul Rahman did not claim sovereignty over Johor.

The Johor Sultanate's title to the island was also confirmed by ties of loyalty that existed between the Sultanate and the Orang Laut, a nomadic sea people who in the past had inhabited the maritime areas of the Singapore Strait, carrying out fishing and piracy, and had visited Pedra Branca quite frequently. This was evidenced by three 19th-century letters written by British officials, including one dated November 1850 by John Turnbull Thomson, the Government Surveyor of Singapore, which had reported on the need to exclude the Orang Laut from Pedra Branca where Horsburgh Lighthouse was being built. Thomson noted that they "frequently visit the rock so their visits should never be encouraged nor any trust put in them ... In the straits and islets of the neighbouring shores and islands many lives are taken by these people."

Malaysia rejected Singapore's argument that the traditional Malay concept of sovereignty was based mainly on control over people and not over territory. It stated that authority in states throughout the world is based on a combination of control over people and territory, and that this applies to the Malay States as it does to any other state. Since the Johor Sultanate was established in the 16th century, it always had rulers who were recognised as such and who thus commanded people's allegiance and therefore controlled the territory where those people lived.

=== Actions of United Kingdom and Singapore those of lighthouse operator ===
Malaysia averred that the actions of the United Kingdom and its successor Singapore in constructing and maintaining Horsburgh Lighthouse on Pedra Branca were actions of the operator of the lighthouse and not the sovereign of the island. Johor had at no time ceded the island to the United Kingdom, but instead had merely granted permission for the lighthouse to be built and maintained on it.

Captain James Horsburgh, a Scottish hydrographer to the British East India Company who had prepared many charts and sailing instructions for the East Indies, China, New Holland, the Cape of Good Hope and other intermediate ports, died in May 1836. Merchants and mariners felt that the building of one or more lighthouses would be a fitting tribute to him, and in as early as November 1836 Pedra Branca was proposed as one of the preferred sites. By 1844, preference had been expressed for Romania Outer Island, or Peak Rock. Some time in November 1844, the Governor of the Straits Settlements, William John Butterworth, wrote to the Sultan and the Temenggung of Johor regarding the matter. His letters have not been found, but English translations of the replies, dated 25 November 1844, exist. The Sultan said:

I have received my friend's letter, and in reply desire to acquaint my friend, that I perfectly understand his wishes, and I am exceedingly pleased at the intention expressed therein, as it (a Light House) will enable Traders and others to enter and leave this Port with greater Confidence.

The Temenggung responded thus:

I have duly received my friend's communication, and understand the contents. My friend is desirous of erecting a Light House near Point Romania. I can have no possible objection to such a measure, indeed I am much pleased that such an undertaking is in contemplation. I wish to be guided in all matters by the Government, so much so, that the [East India] company are at full liberty to put up a Light House there, or any spot deemed eligible. Myself and family for many years have derived support from Singapore, our dependence is wholly on the English Government, and we hope to merit the protection of, and be favoured by the Company on all occasions consistent with propriety.

Three days later, on 28 November 1844, the Governor wrote to the Secretary of the Government in India to recommend that the lighthouse be sited on Peak Rock. Among other things, he said that "[t]his Rock is part of the Territories of the Rajah of Johore, who with the Tamongong ... have willingly consented to cede it gratuitously to the East India Company", and enclosed the replies received from the Sultan and Temenggung. Nonetheless, Malaysia argued that the Sultan and Temenggung's letters amounted to no more than permission to the United Kingdom to build and operate a lighthouse on Peak Rock or some other suitable location.

On 13 November, Malaysia's Agent, Ambassador-at-Large Abdul Kadir Mohamad, alleged that Singapore was trying to "subvert" a 150-year-old arrangement under which Singapore operated Horsburgh Lighthouse on Pedra Branca, which was Malaysia's territory. He also suggested that if permitted to do so, Singapore would upset the peace and stability of the area where the island is located. He said that if Singapore reclaimed land around Pedra Branca, "[q]uite apart from the possible effects on the environment and navigation in the Strait, this could lead to potentially serious changes to the security arrangements in the eastern entrance of the Strait". According to Malaysian Attorney-General Abdul Gani Patail, Singapore had first raised the issue of sovereignty over Pedra Branca on 13 April 1978 during a meeting between officials, saying it had "incontrovertible legal evidence" of its sovereignty over the island though it had never produced any documents in support. Prior to that, the sovereignty of the island had never been disputed. The 1980 statement by the then Malaysian Prime Minister Tun Hussein Onn concerning the "unclear" position of the island had also been premised on these documents which former Singapore Prime Minister Lee Kuan Yew had claimed were in Singapore's possession. The statement was therefore merely a friendly and respectful statement of a visiting prime minister at a press conference which had no probative value in court. All Hussein Onn had meant was that the matter required further discussion between the two countries.

==== 1953 letter by Acting State Secretary of Johor unauthorised ====
Concerning the letter of 21 September 1953 in which the Acting State Secretary of Johor informed the Colonial Secretary of Singapore that "the Johore Government does not claim ownership of Pedra Branca", Malaysia submitted that the Colonial Secretary's enquiry of 12 June 1953 about the status of Pedra Branca showed that the Singapore authorities had no conviction that the island was part of its territory.

Further, the Acting State Secretary "was definitely not authorized" and did not have "the legal capacity to write the 1953 letter, or to renounce, disclaim, or confirm title of any part of the territories of Johor". Under two treaties of 21 January 1948, the Johor Agreement between the British Crown and the Sultan of Johor and the Federation of Malaya Agreement between the British Crown and nine Malay States including Johor, Johor transferred all its rights, power and jurisdiction on matters relating to defence and external affairs to the United Kingdom. These powers were exercisable by the Federal High Commissioner appointed by the United Kingdom and not by the Johor State Secretary. The Acting State Secretary had improperly taken it upon himself to reply to the Colonial Secretary's letter and had not submitted a copy of it to the Chief Secretary of Johor. There was no evidence that the Chief Secretary or the High Commissioner was aware of its contents.

==== Singapore's actions in respect of Pedra Branca not as sovereign ====
Regarding Singapore's contentions that it had exercised sovereign authority over Pedra Branca in various ways, Malaysia responded as indicated below:

- Investigation of shipwrecks in vicinity of Pedra Branca. Singapore had duties to investigate hazards to navigational safety and to publish information about such hazards in its capacity as a lighthouse operator, and under the United Nations Convention on the Law of the Sea and the Convention on the Safety of Life at Sea. Therefore, by investigating and reporting on shipwrecks and maritime hazards within Pedra Branca's territorial waters Singapore had acted in accordance with best practice and not à titre de souverain. The circumstances of the particular investigations also meant that Singapore's ability to carry them out was not based on its sovereignty over the island.
- Display of British and Singapore ensigns on island. Ensigns, associated with maritime matters, are marks of nationality and not sovereignty. Singapore had also not demonstrated any sovereign intent in the flying of the British and Singapore ensigns from Horsburgh Lighthouse. The Pulau Pisang incident was not an acknowledgement by Malaysia of Singapore's sovereignty over Pedra Branca; it had been a matter of domestic political sensibility – Pulau Pisang is much larger than Pedra Branca and has a small local population.
- Installation of military communications equipment and plans to reclaim land. Malaysia alleged that Singapore's installation of military communications equipment on Pedra Branca was done secretly, and that it had only learned about this when it received Singapore's memorial in the case. As regards Singapore's plans to reclaim land around the island, Malaysia said it could not have reacted to some of the documents as they had been secret.

==== Meteorological reports irrelevant; maps inconclusive ====
In response to Singapore's contention in respect of meteorological reports published by Malaysia that had indicated Pedra Branca as a Singapore station, Malaysia said the fact that it recognised Horsburgh Lighthouse as a Singapore rainfall station did not amount an acknowledgement of sovereignty. The six maps that it had published between 1962 and 1975 which had printed the word "(SINGAPORE)" or "(SINGAPURA)" beneath the island were inconclusive. This was because the annotating could be assessed differently, the maps contained disclaimers stating they could not be considered an authority on the delimitation of international or other boundaries, and maps do not create title and cannot amount to admissions unless incorporated into treaties or used in inter-state negotiations.

=== Middle Rocks and South Ledge belong to Malaysia ===
Malaysia contended that Pedra Branca, Middle Rocks and South Ledge were not a single identifiable entity. The historical record showed that the three maritime features were never formally described as a single island with appurtenant islands, or as a group of islands. Middle Rocks and South Ledge were therefore under Johor sovereignty at the time of the 1824 Anglo–Dutch Treaty and fell within the British sphere of influence under the Treaty. Malaysia had exercised consistent acts of sovereignty over them within the limits of their character. For instance, in 1968 the Malaysian Government used and granted petroleum concessions which extended to the area of Middle Rocks and South Ledge. Also, an internal confidential document dated 16 July 1968 entitled "Letter of Promulgation" by the Chief of the Royal Malaysian Navy included charts showing that Pedra Branca, Middle Rocks and South Ledge were within Malaysia's territorial waters, and the features were included within Malaysian fisheries waters in the Fisheries Act 1985. Singapore had neither protested against these manifestations of sovereignty, nor advanced any claims over Middle Rocks and South Ledge in 1980 when it began claiming that Pedra Branca belonged to it.

== Controversies ==
=== Reliability of Malaysia's photograph of Pedra Branca ===
In the course of the hearing, to demonstrate Pedra Branca's proximity to the Johor mainland, Malaysia produced a photograph taken of Pedra Branca with Point Romania and a hill named Mount Berbukit, both in Johor, in the background. However, on 19 November 2007 Singapore produced another photograph taken using a camera that approximated what the human eye sees, and pointed out that in it Mount Berbukit appeared much smaller. It alleged that Malaysia's photograph had been taken using a telephoto lens, which had exaggerated the height of Mount Berbukit by about seven times. Singapore's then Attorney-General Chao Hick Tin said that the photograph had been "an attempt to convey a subliminal message of proximity between Pedra Branca and the coast of Johor", but it was not an accurate reflection of what visitors to Pedra Branca would see if they were looking towards Johor.

Malaysia claimed its photograph was obtained from an online blog, Singapore called the blog "most unusual", noting that it had been created only a month earlier; that the photograph had only been uploaded on 2 November, four days before the oral proceedings in the case had commenced; and that there was no information on the blogger's identity.

In its rebuttal on 24 November, Malaysia said that the difference between the photographs was "all a question of perspective" and that the matter was not worth discussing.

=== Missing 1844 letters ===
A key thrust of Malaysia's case was that the British had received explicit permission from Johor to build a lighthouse on Pedra Branca, which proved that the British had recognised Johor's sovereignty over the island. It submitted that this was evidenced by the November 1844 letters that Governor Butterworth had written to the Sultan and Temenggung of Johor regarding the construction of the lighthouse. Malaysia said it had written to Singapore asking for copies of the letters, because if the letters still existed they were probably in Singapore's archives in a file entitled "Letters to Native Rulers". However, Singapore had never replied.

Singapore's response was that it did not have copies of the letters. Its archives were incomplete, and searches for them in other archives had been in vain. Furthermore, the letters were more likely to be in Malaysia's possession as the Governor had sent them to the Johor rulers. In his rebuttal of Malaysia's case on 19 November 2007, Singapore's Deputy Prime Minister and Minister for Law S. Jayakumar expressed disappointment with Malaysia's insinuation that Singapore had concealed the letters from the Court, which he termed "most disturbing", "baseless" and "distracting".

Malaysia did not mention the matter further in its rebuttal on 24 November.

== ICJ decision ==
The ICJ rendered its decision on 23 May 2008. It held by 12 votes to four that sovereignty over Pedra Branca belongs to Singapore. It further held, by 15 votes to one, that sovereignty over Middle Rocks belongs to Malaysia, and sovereignty over South Ledge belongs to the state in the territorial waters of which it is located.

=== Pedra Branca originally under sovereignty of Johor Sultanate ===
The Court agreed with Malaysia that the Johor Sultanate had original title to Pedra Branca, rejecting Singapore's argument that the island was terra nullius. It found it was not disputed that Johor had established itself as a sovereign state with a certain territorial domain in Southeast Asia since it came into existence in 1512. As Pedra Branca had always been known as a navigational hazard in the Singapore Strait, which was a vital channel for international navigation in east–west trade between the Indian Ocean and the South China Sea, it was inconceivable that the island had remained undiscovered by the local community. It was therefore reasonable to infer that Pedra Branca lay within the general geographical scope of the Johor Sultanate. Further, during the existence of the old Johor Sultanate, there was no evidence of any competing claims over the islands in the Singapore Strait. It also agreed with Malaysia's submission that descriptions of the relationship between the Sultan of Johor and the Orang Laut in 19th-century official British reports proved that the Sultan exercised sovereign authority over the Orang Laut. Since the Orang Laut made the islands in the Singapore Strait their habitat, this confirmed the "ancient original title" of the Johor Sultanate to those islands, including Pedra Branca. As regards Singapore's argument that the traditional concept of Malay sovereignty was based on control over people rather than territory, the Court observed that sovereignty comprises control over both persons and territory. However, it was not necessary to deal with the point further as it had already found that Johor had territorial sovereignty over Pedra Branca.

The purpose of the 1824 Anglo–Dutch Treaty was to finally settle the disputes that had arisen between the United Kingdom and the Netherlands relating to their territorial possessions and commercial interests in the East Indies. It was thus most unlikely that the parties had left the maritime features in the Singapore Straits outside their spheres of influence, as Singapore had contended. Under Article XII of the Treaty, Britain had agreed that "no British Establishment shall be made on the Carimon Isles, or on the Island of Bantam, Bintang, Lingin, or on any of the other Islands South of the Straits of Singapore ..." The islands and islets within the Straits therefore fell within the British sphere of influence. This included Pedra Branca, which remained part of the territorial domain of the new Johor Sultanate. That this was the British understanding of the Treaty was confirmed by a letter dated 4 March 1825 from the Government of India to John Crawfurd, the British Resident in Singapore, which read: "[O]ur acquisition of these Islets [under the Crawfurd Treaty] is not at variance with the obligations of the Treaty concluded at London in March last [the 1824 Anglo–Dutch Treaty] as they are all situated North of the Southern limits of the Straights of Singapore ..." [Emphasis added.] Therefore, Britain's position was that every island north of the southern limits of the Singapore Strait fell within its sphere of influence. The Court's reading of the Anglo–Dutch Treaty was reinforced by letter of 25 June 1825 from Sultan Abdul Rahman to his brother Sultan Hussain, which did not have the effect Singapore attributed to it.

Contrary to Malaysia's submission, the Court found that the Crawfurd Treaty did not show that Britain recognised Johor's sovereignty over all the islands in and around the Singapore Strait. Article II only referred to the cession by the Sultan and Temenggung of Johor of "the Island of Singapore ... together with the adjacent seas, straits, and islets to the extent of ten geographical miles" to the British, and could not be read as an acknowledgement by the United Kingdom that Johor sovereignty over any other territory.

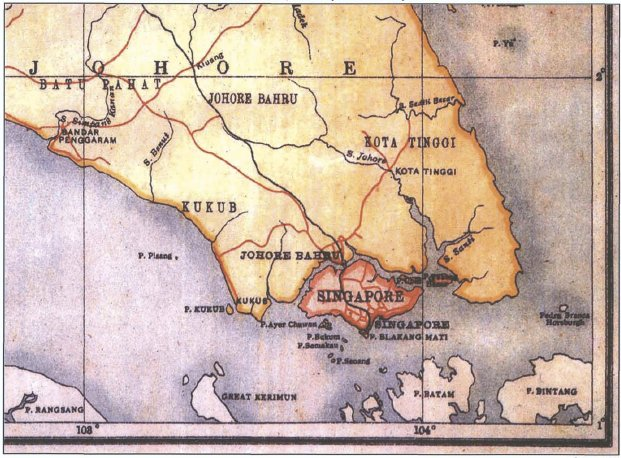
Pedra Branca appears to the right of this detail of a map of British Malaya produced by the Surveyor General of the Federated Malay States and Straits Settlements in 1925.

=== Sovereignty over Pedra Branca passed to Singapore ===
The ICJ noted that under certain circumstances, sovereignty over territory may pass due to the failure of the state which has sovereignty to respond to the other state's conduct à titre de souverain, that is, concrete manifestations of the display of territorial sovereignty by the other state.

Because there was no written agreement relating to Horsburgh Lighthouse and Pedra Branca, the Court was unable to determine whether the November 1844 replies by the Sultan and Temenggung of Johor to Governor Butterworth's query amounted to a cession of the place that would be chosen for the site of the lighthouse or was merely a permission to build, maintain and operate a lighthouse there. Although the Governor had indicated in his 28 November 1844 letter to the Secretary of the Government in India to recommend that the replies amounted to a gratuitous cession to the East India Company, this understanding was not communicated to the Sultan and Temenggung. Similarly, the fact that Britain had not informed Johor about its decision to site the lighthouse on Pedra Branca might be seen either as recognition that Britain only had consent to build and operate it, or that Johor no longer had rights over the island. On the evidence adduced, the Court was unable to reach a conclusion on the issue. It also did not draw any conclusions about the construction and commissioning of the lighthouse, stating only that it saw the events as "bearing on the issue of the evolving views of the authorities in Johor and Singapore about sovereignty over Pedra Branca/Pulau Batu Puteh". It noted, though, that apart from a two-day visit by the Temenggung and his followers to the island in early June 1850, Johor had no involvement in the project.

The Court declined to accept Malaysia's argument that the Singapore Colonial Secretary's query about the status of Pedra Branca in 1953 indicated that the United Kingdom had no conviction that the island was part of its territory. It felt the letter of inquiry showed the Singapore authorities were not clear about events that had occurred over a century earlier and that they were unsure their records were complete, which was understandable in the circumstances. It also disagreed that the Acting State Secretary of Johor, who had stated in his letter of reply that Johor did not claim ownership of the island, had acted without authority. The Johor Agreement was irrelevant – as the Colonial Secretary was a representative of the United Kingdom government which was not a foreign state in relation to Johor at the time, there was no question of the United Kingdom having to consent to Johor issuing the reply. The Federation of Malaya Agreement also did not assist Malaysia because the action of responding to a request for information was not an "exercise" of "executive authority". Further, since Malaysia had not invoked this argument in its negotiations with Singapore and in the ICJ proceedings until late in the oral phase, Singapore was entitled to presume that the Acting State Secretary had acted within his authority. The meaning of the reply was clear – as of 1953, Johor understood it did not have sovereignty over Pedra Branca, and thus the Singapore authorities had no reason to doubt that the island belonged to the United Kingdom.

The Court regarded as conduct à titre de souverain Singapore's investigation of six shipwrecks in the vicinity of Pedra Branca between 1920 and 1993, its exclusive control over visits to the island, the installation of the military rebroadcast station on the island in 1977, and the proposed reclamation of land around it. Malaysia was correct in asserting that the flying of an ensign was not normally a manifestation of sovereignty, and that the difference in size between Pulau Pisang and Pedra Branca had to be recognised. Nonetheless, some weight could be given to the fact that Malaysia had not requested for the Singapore ensign flying at Horsburgh Lighthouse to be taken down. The fact that Malaysia had referred to the lighthouse as a Singapore station in the 1959 and 1966 meteorological reports and had omitted it from the 1967 Malaysian report favoured Singapore's case.

The maps published by Malaysia between 1962 and 1975 tended to confirm that it considered Pedra Branca to fall under Singapore sovereignty. The "(SINGAPORE)" or "(SINGAPURA)" annotations on the maps in respect of the island were clear and supported Singapore's case. The maps gave a good indication of Malaysia's official position on the matter, and could amount to an admission. Finally, Malaysia could not rely on the disclaimers on the maps as the present matter did not concern a boundary but a distinct island. In any case, the maps were statements of geographical fact, particularly since Malaysia had itself produced and disseminated it against its own interest.

In view of the above, the Court held that by 1980 sovereignty over Pedra Branca had passed from Malaysia to Singapore.

=== Sovereignty over Middle Rocks and South Ledge ===
None of the conduct by the United Kingdom and Singapore that led to the ICJ to conclude that Singapore had gained sovereignty over Pedra Branca applied to Middle Rocks. Since Johor held the ancient original title to Middle Rocks, the Court held that this title remains with Malaysia as the successor to the Johor Sultanate.

South Ledge falls within the apparently overlapping territorial waters generated by the mainland of Malaysia, Pedra Branca and Middle Rocks. Although in the Special Agreement and in their final submissions Malaysia and Singapore had asked the Court to decide which state had sovereignty over Pedra Branca, Middle Rocks and South Ledge, the Court had not been mandated to delimit the extent of the territorial waters of the two states in the area in question. Therefore, it simply held that South Ledge, as a low-tide elevation, belongs to the state in the territorial waters of which it is located.

== Reactions and further developments ==
=== Reactions ===
On 23 May 2008, Malaysian Foreign Minister Rais Yatim described the ICJ decision as creating a "win-win" situation and that both countries would "forge ahead" in their bilateral relationship. Deputy Prime Minister Najib Tun Razak called the judgment a "balanced decision" as Malaysia had been "partly successful" in its territorial claims. Interviewed by journalists at The Hague, Singapore's Deputy Prime Minister S. Jayakumar said: "We are pleased with the judgment because the court has awarded sovereignty over Pedra Branca, which is the main feature in dispute, to Singapore." Prime Minister of Singapore Lee Hsien Loong said he was pleased with the result, and commented that bringing the dispute to the ICJ was "a good way for [Malaysia and Singapore] to resolve disagreements or problems while maintaining good relations with each other".

==== Malaysia ====
On the day the ICJ released its judgment, Rais Yatim asserted that since South Ledge was within the territorial waters of Middle Rocks, "Malaysia appears to be the sovereign holder". A week later, the Foreign Ministry of Malaysia asked the Malaysian media to cease using the Malay word Pulau ("Island") for Pedra Branca and to refer to it as "Batu Puteh" or "Pedra Branca".

The ICJ's decision is final and not subject to appeal. Nevertheless, in June 2008 Rais Yatim stated that Malaysia had renewed its search for the letter written by Governor Butterworth to the Sultan and Temenggung of Johor seeking permission to build Horsburgh Lighthouse on Pedra Branca. He noted that the rules of the ICJ allowed a case to be reviewed within ten years if new evidence was adduced. In response, Singapore's Law Minister K. Shanmugam said that the city-state would wait to see what new evidence the Malaysian government could come up with.

Several Malaysian Members of Parliament have urged the Federal Government to assert sovereignty over Pulau Pisang which also has a lighthouse on it that is operated by Singapore, or to take over administration of the lighthouse. Concerns were also expressed for Pulau Merambong near the western boundary of Malaysia and Singapore. The Menteri Besar of Johor, Abdul Ghani Othman, assured the public that Pulau Pisang belongs to Johor under a 1900 agreement between Sultan Ibrahim of Johor and British administrators in colonial Singapore. Nonetheless, Malaysian agencies have taken up efforts to stake claims over a hundred islands, reefs, rocks and other features in the South China Sea, Malacca Straits, and off Sabahan waters that Malaysia could lose to China, Indonesia and Vietnam. Two of these islands are Pulau Unarang off eastern Sabah near the Indonesian border, and Pulau Perak to the west of Penang.

At the opening of Johor's 12th State Assembly in June 2008, Sultan Iskandar of Johor pledged to reclaim the island "whatever it takes". Speaking impromptu at the end of a prepared speech, the Sultan said in Malay: "Let us be reminded that I do not forget Pulau Batu Puteh. Pulau Batu Puteh is not Singapore's, but it belongs to Johor. It does not matter how long it may take, I will find the way to get back the island, which belongs to Johor." The Menteri Besar of Johor said the state government had "clearly heard" what the Sultan said, but did not elaborate.

On 3 September 2008, Tengku Razaleigh Hamzah, a Kelantanese prince and MP from the state, sent a letter to Rais Yatim claiming that Johor's interests had not been raised before the ICJ. He alleged that the seas surrounding Pedra Branca had always been in Johor's hands and had never been surrendered to the British or to Singapore, and by accepting the ICJ decision and participating in technical discussions with Singapore the Malaysian government had infringed Johor's constitutional rights. Responding, Rais said the letter seemed designed for "political mileage" and that Johor had been fully involved in the proceedings. He told the Straits Times, "Everybody has his opinion on such matters but I, as Foreign Minister, have to abide by the dictate of the law. I have to see the letter first but it's rather late in the day to express disappointment."

==== Singapore ====
On 21 July 2008, in response to questions from Singapore Members of Parliament about Pedra Branca, the Senior Minister of State for Foreign Affairs Balaji Sadasivan stated that the maritime territory around the island included a territorial sea of up to 12 nautical miles (22 km; 14 mi) and an Exclusive Economic Zone. This was condemned by Malaysia's Foreign Minister Rais Yatim as "against the spirit of ASEAN and the legal structure" as the claim was "unacceptable and unreasonable and contradicts the principles of international law". In response, a Singapore Ministry of Foreign Affairs spokesman said that Singapore first stated its claim to a territorial sea and Exclusive Economic Zone on 15 September 1980, and reiterated this claim on 23 May 2008 following the ICJ's judgment. Both statements had made clear that if the limits of Singapore's territorial sea or Exclusive Economic Zone overlapped with the claims of neighbouring countries, Singapore would negotiate with those countries to arrive at agreed delimitations in accordance with international law. In August 2008, Rais said Malaysia took the view that Singapore was not entitled to claim an Exclusive Economic Zone around Pedra Branca as it considered that the maritime feature did not meet internationally recognised criteria for an island, that is, land inhabited by humans that had economic activity.

At the launch of S. Jayakumar and Tommy Koh's book Pedra Branca: The Road to the World Court on 19 December 2008, Chief Justice Chan Sek Keong commented: "The Pedra Branca case is likely to be a unique event in the history of Singapore as it is unlikely that Singapore will ever again need to seek confirmation of her title to territory under international law."

=== Resolution of outstanding issues ===
Malaysia and Singapore have established what they have named the Joint Technical Committee to delimit the maritime boundary in the area around Pedra Branca and Middle Rocks, and to determine the ownership of South Ledge. Following a meeting on 3 June 2008, the Committee agreed that a technical sub-committee would be established to oversee the conduct of joint survey works to prepare the way for talks on maritime issues in and around the area. If any incident occurred in and around the waters of Pedra Branca, Middle Rocks and South Ledge, either side would provide humanitarian assistance to the vessels involved. Finally, both Malaysian and Singaporean fishermen could continue traditional fishing activities in those waters. In September 2008, the Joint Technical Committee reported that its Sub-Committee on Joint Survey Works was finalising technical preparations for a hydrographic survey that would provide data for future delimitation discussions. A Sub-Committee on Maritime and Airspace Management and Fisheries had also been formed, and after a meeting on 20 August 2008 it decided that traditional fishing activities by both countries should continue in waters beyond 0.5 nautical miles (0.9 km; 0.6 mi) off Pedra Branca, Middle Rocks and South Ledge. In October 2023, at the 10th Singapore-Malaysia Leaders' Retreat, Singapore's then-Prime Minister Lee Hsien Loong and Malaysia's Prime Minister Dato’ Seri Anwar Ibrahim released a joint statement saying that they looked forward to the resolution of the outstanding bilateral maritime boundary delimitation issues. The offices have yet to release the results of any follow-ups.

=== Application requesting interpretation of 2008 judgment and subsequent withdrawal ===
On 2 February 2017, Malaysia applied to the ICJ pursuant to Article 61 of the Statute of the ICJ for the revision of the 2008 judgment on the basis of three documents it had obtained from The National Archives of the UK between August 2016 and January 2017. The documents were internal correspondence of Singapore's colonial government in 1958, an incident report submitted by a British naval officer in the same year, and a 1960s map of naval operations bearing annotations. The Malaysian Government said that these documents indicated that "officials at the highest levels in the British colonial and Singaporean administration appreciated that Pedra Branca/Pulau Batu Puteh did not form part of Singapore's sovereign territory" during the relevant period. Therefore, "the Court would have been bound to reach a different conclusion on the question of sovereignty over Pedra Branca/Pulau Batu Puteh had it been aware of this new evidence". However, according to Shahriman Lockman, a senior analyst at Malaysia's Institute of Strategic and International Studies, "there's very little precedent for revisions to ICJ judgments". Reports suggest that the timing of the application coincides with the upcoming elections in Malaysia, as the ruling Barisan Nasional Coalition, which is currently under pressure over the IMDB scandal, could "use the renewed legal fight over Pedra Branca as a means to show it was 'best placed to display strong leadership in the country's foreign policy so as to safeguard Malaysia's sovereignty'".

Singapore's Foreign Ministry said that a team including Attorney-General Lucien Wong, and Chan Sek Keong, S. Jayakumar and Tommy Koh (who had represented Singapore at the original ICJ hearing), had been appointed to study and respond to the claim. On 5 February 2017, Law and Home Affairs Minister K. Shanmugam commented that on a cursory examination of the documents without detailed legal advice, he did not see how the documents would make any difference to the ICJ's judgment. On 2 March, Foreign Minister Dr Vivian Balakrishnan said in Parliament that the Singapore legal team has studied Malaysia's application carefully, including the three documents relied on by Malaysia to support its application, and strongly believes that the documents relied on by Malaysia do not satisfy the criteria under Article 61. Singapore has until 14 June to submit to the ICJ its comprehensive and compelling rebuttal to Malaysia's application.

On 30 June 2017, Malaysia applied to the ICJ to request for an interpretation of the ICJ's 2008 judgment. This application is "separate and autonomous" from the 2 February application for the revision of the same judgment. The application invokes Article 60 of the Statute of the Court and Article 98 of the Rules of the Court. According to Malaysian Attorney-General Mohamed Apandi Ali, Malaysia and Singapore set up a Joint Technical Committee (JTC) for the implementation of the 2008 ICJ judgment. According to Malaysia, the JTC reached an impasse in November 2013, as both parties had been unable to agree over the meaning of the 2008 judgement as it concerns the South Ledge and the waters surrounding Pedra Branca. Explaining Malaysia's position, Malaysian Attorney-General Apandi said: "Malaysia considers that it is necessary to request an interpretation of the 2008 judgement from the ICJ as it would serve as a basis for the maintenance of orderly and peaceful relations between the parties in the management of their respective maritime zones and airspace in the future".

Singapore's Ministry of Foreign Affairs (MFA) noted in a press statement that ICJ's judgement was "final and without appeal", as well as "clear and unambiguous". As a result, MFA said: "Malaysia's request for the ICJ to interpret the judgement is puzzling. Singapore will therefore oppose Malaysia's application for interpretation, which we consider to be both unnecessary and without merit".

Malaysia's new government withdrew their application for the review on 30 May 2018, a move which was welcomed by Singapore's MFA as the 10-year period had lapsed, putting the matter to rest.

== See also ==
- Foreign relations of Malaysia
- Foreign relations of Singapore
- List of International Court of Justice cases
- Malaysia–Singapore border
