= Pulau Merambong =

Island in Pontian, Johor, Malaysia

Pulau Merambong Pulo Ular
Native name: ڤولاو مرمبوڠ
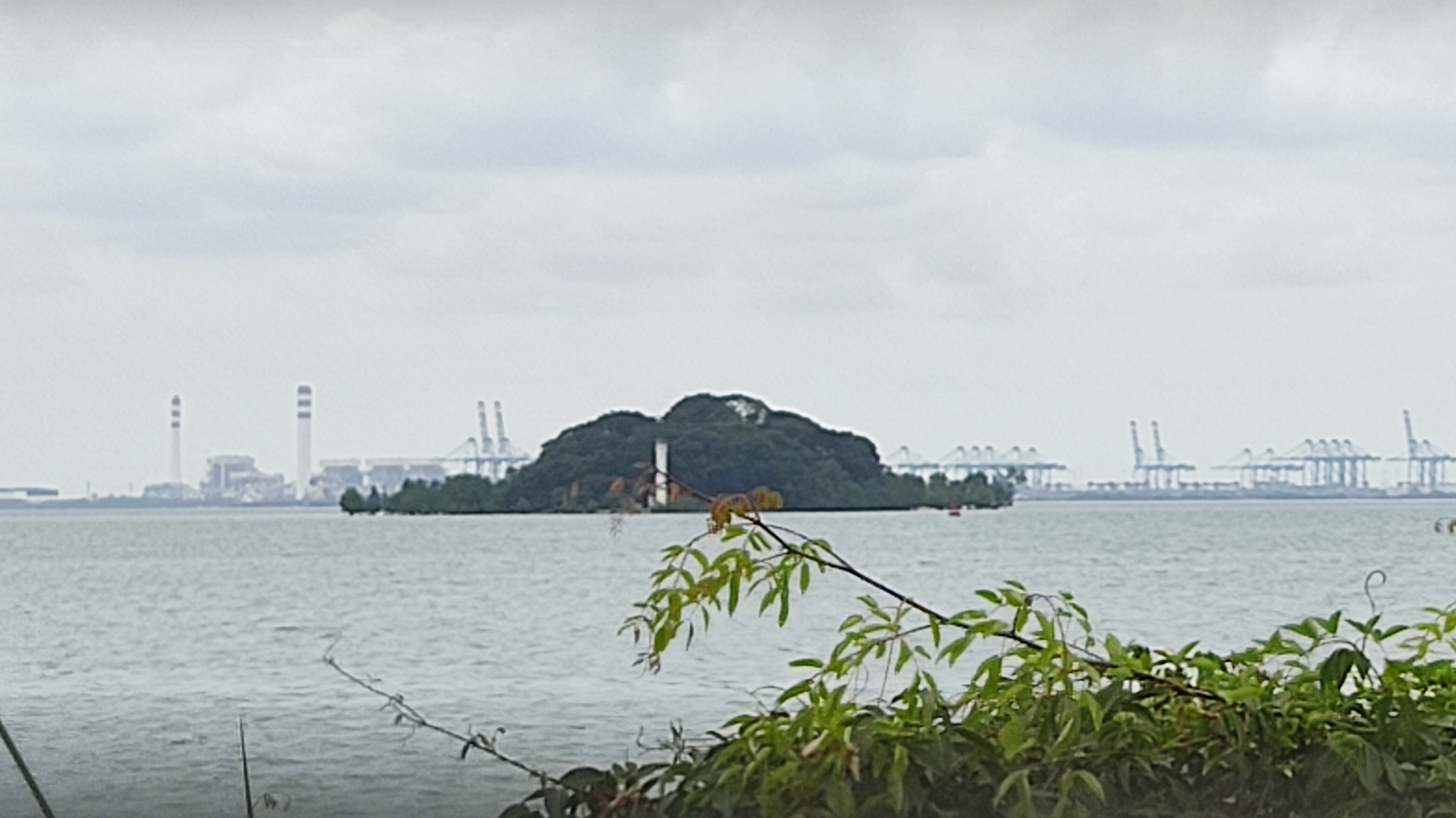
- Pulau Merambong as viewed from Tuas, Singapore
- Interactive map of Pulau Merambong; Pulo Ular

Geography
- Location: Straits of Johor
- Coordinates: 1°18′54″N 103°36′35″E
- Area: 0.03 km^{2} (0.012 sq mi)

Administration
- Malaysia
- State: Johor
- District: Johor Bahru
- Mukim: Tanjung Kupang

Pulau Merambong, formerly known as Pulo Ular, is an uninhabited island on the Straits of Johor. The island is dominated by mangrove swamp. It is located just 1 kilometre (0.62 miles) off the coast from Tuas, Singapore. Administratively, it is placed under the Johor Bahru District, Johor, Malaysia.

== Conservation ==
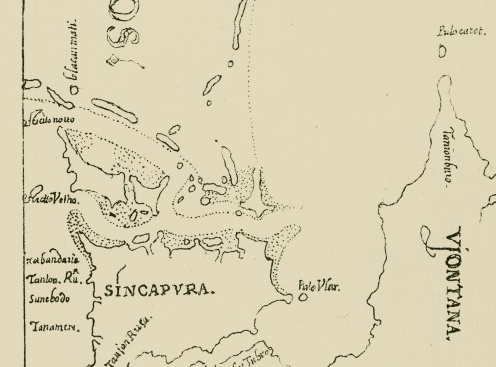
A 1604 map by Godinho de Erédia titled Singapura showing Pulau Merambong named as Pulo Ular (Snake Island).

Pulau Merambong is located within the single largest seagrass bed in the country. The bed extends from the island right up to the estuary of Pulai River in Johor. Dugongs and seahorses, which feed on seagrass, make their home in the nearby coral reefs. Environmentalists are concerned that the development of Port of Tanjung Pelepas is threatening the area and the livelihood of seahorses as well as dugongs and turtles. The island is planned to be gazette as a nature park with various environmental based NGOs funding it.

== Sovereignty dispute ==
In the aftermath of the International Court of Justice (ICJ) ruling that saw Pedra Branca being awarded to Singapore, concerns on Malaysian sovereignty over Pulau Merambong have been raised. Some proponents on the Malaysian side have cited the Straits Settlement and Johore Territorial Waters Agreement of 1927 between the British Empire and its Straits Settlements colony claiming that the boundaries between Singapore and Johor were settled. On the Singaporean side, not much thought has been given over Pulau Merambong as of yet.

== Singaporean territorial waters incident ==
On 13 April 2007, two Interceptor Crafts of the Special Task Squadron of Singapore's Police Coast Guard (PCG) were on ambush duty off Tuas in the vicinity of Tuas Jetty, when a speedboat with six illegal immigrants and cartons of cigarettes intruded into Singapore's territorial waters at about 9:30 pm from the direction of Malaysia. The speedboat sped off when approached by the police, resulting in a five-minute chase which ended with a collision between one of the crafts and the speedboat near Pulau Merambong. PK 50 capsized, while the speedboat was completely wrecked. Two officers were rescued from the scene within minutes with minor injuries, while another two were found dead. Three passengers on the intruding vessels were also rescued, and a fourth man found dead. The rest of the passengers were still missing.

== See also ==
- List of islands of Malaysia
