= Middle Creek =

Middle Creek may refer to the following streams:

in Australia

- Middle Creek (New South Wales)

in the United States

- Middle Creek (California), a tributary of Cerrito Creek in Alameda County, California
- Middle Creek (Lake County, California), a tributary of Clear Lake, Lake County, California
- Middle Creek (Toms Creek tributary), a tributary of Toms Creek in Pennsylvania and Maryland
- Middle Creek (Cocalico Creek tributary), a tributary of Cocalico Creek in Pennsylvania
- Middle Creek (Lackawaxen River tributary), a tributary of the Lackawaxen River in Pennsylvania
- Middle Creek (Penns Creek tributary), a tributary of Penns Creek in Pennsylvania
- Middle Creek (Schwaben Creek tributary), a tributary of Schwaben Creek in Pennsylvania
