= Middle Township =

Middle Township can refer to the following places in the United States:

- Middle Township, Franklin County, Arkansas, in Franklin County, Arkansas
- Middle Township, Hendricks County, Indiana
- Middle Township, New Jersey
