= Middle Brother =

Middle Brother may refer to:

== Places ==
- Middle Brother (Chagos Bank), an island in the British Indian Ocean Territory
- Middle Brother Islet, Queensland, Australia
- Middle Brother National Park, New South Wales, Australia
- Middle Brother, Three Brothers (New South Wales), Australia, a mountain

== Other uses ==
- Middle Brother (band), American rock band
  - Middle Brother (album), 2011
