= Middle Sound =

Bay in North Carolina, USA

Coordinates: 34°15′43″N 77°45′45″W

Middle Sound is a bay in New Hanover County, North Carolina, in the United States.

Middle Sound was named for its central location between two other sounds.
