= Middle Road =

Middle Road may refer to:

- Middle Road, Hong Kong, in Tsim Sha Tsui, Kowloon, Hong Kong
- Middle Road, Singapore
- The Middle Road, Canada, which was renamed as part of the Queen Elizabeth Way in 1939
- Middle Road (Suffolk County), a road in Long Island, New York signed as Suffolk County Road 48

== See also ==
- "Middle Road", a song by Aziz Ibrahim
