= Middle Bay =

Middle Bay may refer to the following places:

- Middle Bay, Bonne-Espérance, Quebec, Canada
- Middle Bay (Dominica), in Dominica
- Middle Bay (Hong Kong)

== See also ==
- Middle Bay Light, offshore from Mobile, Alabama, U.S.
