= Middle Rocks =

Uninhabited islands in the Strait of Singapore

Native name: Batuan Tengah باتون تڠه
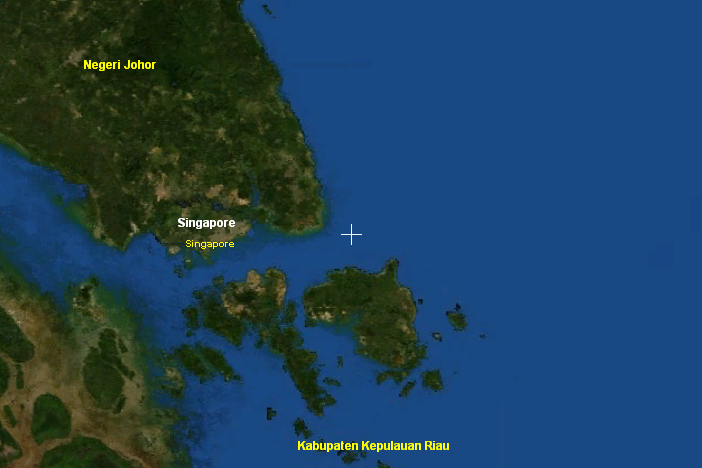
- The approximate location of Middle Rocks in the South China Sea is marked on the map by a cross.
- Interactive map of Middle Rocks

Geography
- Location: South China Sea
- Coordinates: 1°19′17″N 104°24′32″E

Administration
- Malaysia

The Middle Rocks (Malay: Batuan Tengah; Jawi: باتون تڠه; Chinese: 中岩礁; pinyin: Zhōngyánjiāo; lit. 'Middle Rock Reef') are two uninhabited small rocks separated by 250 metres (820 ft) of open water at the eastern opening of the Strait of Singapore on the western edge of the South China Sea. As part of the Pedra Branca dispute, the islands were disputed territory between Malaysia and Singapore until, on 23 May 2008, the International Court of Justice decided that sovereignty over Middle Rocks belonged to Malaysia by 15 votes to one.

== Geography ==
The Middle Rocks are 8.0 nautical miles (14.8 km; 9.2 mi) to the southeast of the Malaysian state of Johor and 0.6 nautical miles (1.1 km; 0.69 mi) south of Pedra Branca, and stand between 0.6 metres (2.0 ft) and 1.0 metre (3.3 ft) above sea level.

== Ownership dispute ==
The approximate location of Middle Rocks in the South China Sea in relation to the countries and islands surrounding it.

Together with Pedra Branca and another rock formation within the vicinity known as South Ledge, Middle Rocks were the subject of a territorial dispute between Malaysia and Singapore. For Middle Rocks and South Ledge, the dispute arose when Singapore claimed both islets in 1993. The matter was settled by the International Court of Justice in 2008, which ruled that Middle Rocks belonged to Malaysia and Pedra Branca to Singapore. The status of South Ledge remains unresolved.

Following the decision, Singapore and Malaysia said they would hold discussions to establish the maritime border around the area. Both countries established the Malaysia-Singapore Joint Technical Committee (MSJTC) to implement the court's judgement. According to Malaysia, the MSJTC reached an impasse in November 2013. Malaysia clarified that one of the key reasons is that "the parties have been unable to agree over the meaning of the 2008 judgement as it concerns South Ledge and the waters surrounding Pedra Branca.

Malaysia sent a team from its Mapping and Survey Department which constructed a flag pole, five markers and a monument between 4 and 12 June 2008. The Malaysian flag was raised and the team sang the Malaysian national anthem, Negaraku, during a ceremony which was covered by the press on 13 and 14 June 2008.

=== Establishment of Abu Bakar Maritime Base ===
On 5 August 2017, Jane's Defence Weekly reported that Malaysia had established a new maritime installation, the Abu Bakar Maritime Base, on Middle Rocks, which consists of two clusters of rocks located 0.6 nautical miles (1.1 km; 0.69 mi) south of Pedra Branca (which was awarded to Singapore in the aftermath of the 2008 ICJ ruling) that Malaysia is currently challenging.

The base, built just 1100 metres (3,600 feet) from Singaporean facilities on Pedra Branca, comprises a 316-metre (1,037 foot) jetty connecting the rocks, off of which branches a helipad and various other structures and smaller piers, and a lighthouse on the westernmost cluster of rocks. The base is equipped with a state-of-the-art remote surveillance system, solid waste system and climate station system, and is manned around the clock by a staff of three officers and 14 personnel. Construction on the base began in April 2012 and was completed at a cost of RM61.5 million (approximately S$20 million). The base was inaugurated on 1 August 2015 by the Sultan of Johor, Ibrahim Ismail Iskandar. Also present at the inauguration was the Royal Malaysian Navy chief, Admiral Ahmad Kamarulzaman Ahmad Badaruddin, as well as senior officials from other maritime agencies. According to the Sultan of Johor, the installation, which is a project under the auspices of the National Security Council, "is aimed at safeguarding Malaysia's sovereign territory and waters, and for conducting marine scientific research". The base also seeks to reaffirm "Malaysia's absolute sovereignty over the Middle Rocks".

On 11 August, Malaysia deployed a missile-capable fast-attack craft Perdana to Abu Bakar Maritime Base. Royal Malaysian Navy chief Admiral Ahmad Kamarulzaman Ahmad Badaruddin confirmed the deployment when he posted photographs of Perdana's arrival at the base. Photos posted by the Navy chief showed two armed guards on an observation deck, as well as a communications system fitted with surveillance equipment, as pointed out by Jane's Defence Weekly. In late May 2018, Malaysia announcing their plan to convert Middle Rocks into an island.

In announcing Malaysia's plans on the week of 2 Jun 2018, Dr Mahathir said: "We have already built features there on Middle Rocks. Our intention is to enlarge it so that we can form a small island for us. He added "That is something we are thinking of." When pressed to clarify Malaysia's plans, he said: "We haven't made a full decision yet." When asked about Malaysia's plans to expand Middle Rocks, a spokesman for Singapore's Ministry of Foreign Affairs said: “Sovereignty over Middle Rocks belongs to Malaysia. We have no comments on Malaysia’s activities on Middle Rocks as long as they are in accordance with international law.”
