= Pedra Branca, Singapore =

Easternmost island of Singapore

Pedra Branca Batu Putih
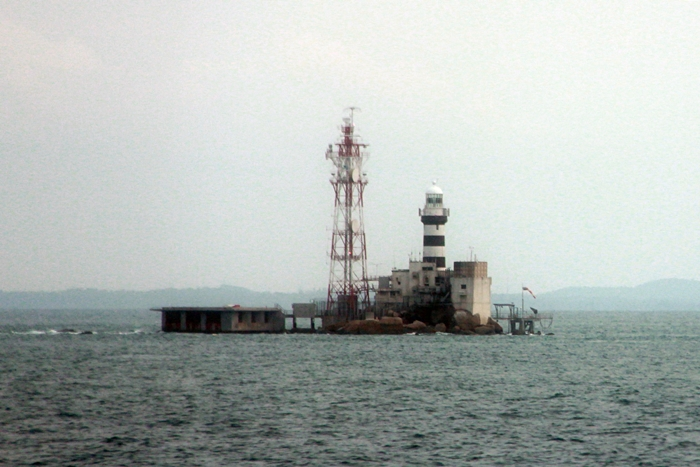
- Pedra Branca and Horsburgh Lighthouse
- Location of Pedra Branca

Geography
- Location: Southeast Asia
- Coordinates: 01°19′49″N 104°24′21″E
- Archipelago: Malay Archipelago
- Area: 0.00856 km^{2} (0.00331 sq mi)

Administration
- Singapore
- Region: East Region
- Planning area: Changi Bay
- CDC: North East CDC
- Town council: Pasir Ris–Changi Town Council
- Constituency: Pasir Ris–Changi GRC

Pedra Branca (European Portuguese: [ˈpɛðɾɐ ˈβɾɐ̃kɐ]), also known as Batu Putih (Malay: [batu puteh]), is an outlying island and the easternmost point of Singapore. The name of the island, which is Portuguese for "white rock", refers to whitish guano deposited on the rock. The island consists of a small outcrop of granite rocks with an area of about 8,560 square metres (0.00856 km^{2}) at low tide. During the low water spring tide it measures, at its longest, 137 metres (449 ft) and has an average width of 60 metres (200 ft). Pedra Branca is situated where the Singapore Strait meets the South China Sea, and so is considered a maritime landmark of the eastern entrance of the Singapore Strait.

There are two maritime features near Pedra Branca. Middle Rocks, under the sovereignty of Malaysia, consists of two clusters of small rocks about 250 metres (820 ft) apart situated 0.6 nautical miles (1.1 km; 0.7 mi) south of Pedra Branca. South Ledge, which is 2.2 nautical miles (4.1 km; 2.5 mi) to the south-south-west of Pedra Branca, is a rock formation visible only at low-tide.

Pedra Branca was known to sailors for centuries. It was originally within the territory of the Johor Sultanate, which was founded in 1528, and remained under the new Sultanate of Johor while under the British sphere of influence following the signing of the Anglo-Dutch Treaty of 1824 between the United Kingdom and the Netherlands. Between 1850 and 1851, the British built Horsburgh Lighthouse on the island without seeking the consent of the Johor authorities or informing them of the decision. From that time, the Straits Settlements administered the island; Singapore then assumed responsibility in 1946 after the dissolution of the Straits Settlements. On 21 September 1953, the Acting State Secretary of Johor, responding to a query from the Colonial Secretary of Singapore about the status of the island, stated that "the Johore Government does not claim ownership of Pedra Branca".

On 21 December 1979, Malaysia published a map that showed the island to be within its territorial waters. This ignited a 29-year territorial dispute which, together with the issue of sovereignty over the nearby maritime features of Middle Rocks and South Ledge, the disputants presented to the International Court of Justice (ICJ) for resolution. On 23 May 2008, the ICJ ruled that Pedra Branca was under Singapore's sovereignty. At this point, the ICJ also noted Singapore's plans to conduct reclamation at Pedra Branca. Although the island had originally been under the sovereignty of the Johor Sultanate, the United Kingdom and Singapore had carried out various acts of sovereignty in respect of the island. The failure of Malaysia and its predecessors to respond to these acts, and other actions that demonstrated their acknowledgment of Singapore's sovereignty over the island, meant that Singapore had gained sovereignty over Pedra Branca. On the other hand, Middle Rocks remain part of Malaysian territory as Singapore had not manifested any acts of sovereignty in respect to it. The Court did not rule definitively on the remaining outcrop, South Ledge, declaring that it belonged to the state in the territorial waters of which it is located. Malaysia and Singapore have established the Joint Technical Committee to delimit the maritime boundary in the area around Pedra Branca and Middle Rocks, and to determine the ownership of South Ledge.

Singapore also asserts claims to territorial waters and airspace around Pedra Branca, including a slice of the South China Sea, which is discontiguous with the rest of Singapore's territorial waters. This discontiguity is due to Pedra Branca's location 40 kilometers east of the Singapore mainland, through a narrow strait between Malaysian and Indonesian land. The award of sovereignty of Pedra Branca to Singapore has raised concerns in Malaysia if Pulau Pisang, near the west end of the Singapore Strait on which Singapore also operates a lighthouse, may also face territorial claims from Singapore. Thus far both Malaysian and Singapore governments have expressed that there is no question of Malaysia's sovereignty over Pulau Pisang.

== Etymology ==
Pedra Branca means "white rock" in Portuguese, and refers to whitish guano (bird droppings) deposited on the rock by the black-naped tern, which used the island as a nesting ground. This name is used by both the English-language and Malay-language press in Singapore. Malaysia formerly referred to the island as Pulau Batu Puteh, which means "white rock island" in Malay, but the Government of Malaysia subsequently decided to drop the word Pulau ("Island"). In August 2008 Foreign Minister Rais Yatim said Malaysia considered that the maritime feature did not meet internationally recognised criteria for an island, that is, land inhabited by humans that had economic activity.

The island is known in Mandarin as Baijiao (Chinese: 白礁; pinyin: báijiāo), which means "white reef". The Tamil name is பெத்ரா பிராங்கா, a transliteration of Pedra Branca.

== Geography ==
The approximate location of Pedra Branca in the South China Sea in relation to the countries surrounding it

Pedra Branca, located at 1° 19′ 48″ N and 104° 24′ 27″ E, is an island with an area of about 8,560 square metres (92,100 sq ft) at low tide. During the low water spring tide it measures, at its longest, a mere 137 metres (449 ft) and has an average width of 60 metres (200 ft). It is approximately 24 nautical miles (44 km; 28 mi) to the east of Singapore; 7.7 nautical miles (14.3 km; 8.9 mi) south of Johor, Malaysia; and 7.6 nautical miles (14.1 km; 8.7 mi) north of Bintan, Indonesia.

There are two maritime features near Pedra Branca. Middle Rocks, which is under the sovereignty of Malaysia, consists of two clusters of small rocks about 250 metres (820 ft) apart situated 0.6 nautical miles (1.1 km; 0.7 mi) south of the island. They stand 0.6 metres (2.0 ft) to 1.2 metres (3.9 ft) permanently above water. South Ledge, on the other hand, is a rock formation visible only at low-tide. It is 2.2 nautical miles (4.1 km; 2.5 mi) to the south-south-west of Pedra Branca. Its ownership has yet to be definitively determined by Malaysia and Singapore.

Rock samples from Pedra Branca, Middle Rocks and South Ledge show they are all composed of a light, coarse-grained biotite granite. Therefore, from a geomorphological standpoint, the three maritime features belong to the same rock body.

== History ==
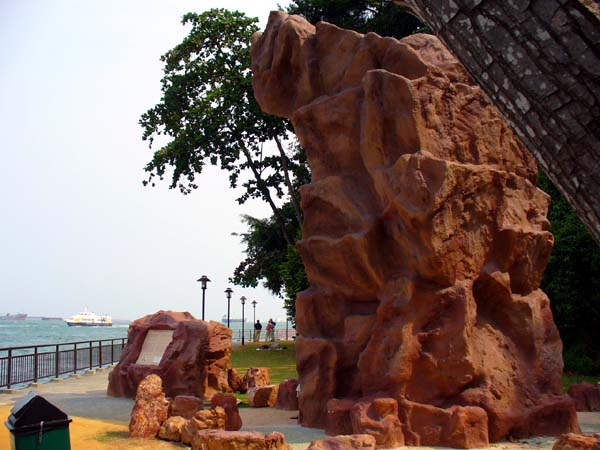
A replica of Long Ya Men at the Labrador Nature Reserve, put up in 2005 as part of the Singapore Zheng He's 600th Anniversary Celebrations

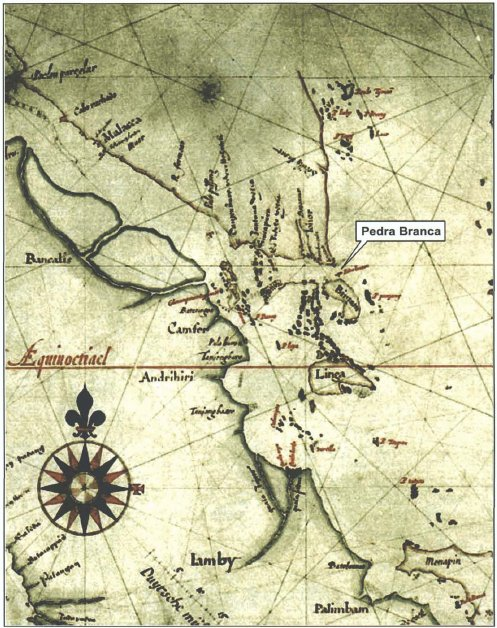
Detail of a 1620 "Map of Sumatra" by Hessel Gerritz, a cartographer with the Hydrographic Service of the Dutch East India Company. The location of the island of "Pedrablanca" (Pedra Branca) is marked

Pedra Branca was known to sailors for centuries. Part of the Chinese sailing instructions for the South China Sea based on information compiled by Admiral Zheng He (1371–1433) advised a navigator that after departing Long Ya Men (Mandarin for "Dragon's Teeth Gate"), a rocky outcrop at the gateway to what is now Keppel Harbour in Singapore, he should steer a course of between 75° and 90° for five watches until his vessel reached Baijiao. Pedra Branca was also mentioned in Dutch voyager Jan Huyghen van Linschoten's Itinerario (Itinerary), an account of his voyages in the Portuguese East Indies. After the publication of the work in 1596, the island began appearing regularly on European maps of the Far East. The 1598 English edition of the work stated:

From the Cape of Singapura to the hook named Sinosura to the east, are 18 miles; 6 or 7 miles from there lies a cliffe in the sea called Pedra Branque, or White Rock, where the shippes that come and goe from China doe oftentymes passe in greate danger and some are left upon it, whereby the Pilots when they come thither are in greate feare for other way than this they have not.

Pedra Branca was originally within the territory of the Johor-Riau Sultanate, which was founded in 1528 by Sultan Alauddin Riayat Shah II, the son of Sultan Mahmud Shah of the Malacca Sultanate. In the mid-17th century, the Dutch Governor of Malacca wrote to the Dutch East India Company, asking it to send two boats to the Straits of Singapore to "cruise to the south of Singapore Straits under the Hook of Barbukit and in the vicinity of Pedra Branca" to stop Chinese traders from entering Johor River. The plan was put into force, and two Chinese junks were captured in the Straits and diverted to Malacca. However, this action provoked a protest from the Sultan of Johor, which showed that the Sultan regarded the junks' seizure as an infringement of his sovereignty in the area. Three letters written in 1824 to the Government of India by the British Resident in Singapore, John Crawfurd, also confirm it was his understanding that all the islands in the region of the Straits of Singapore came under the Johor Sultanate.

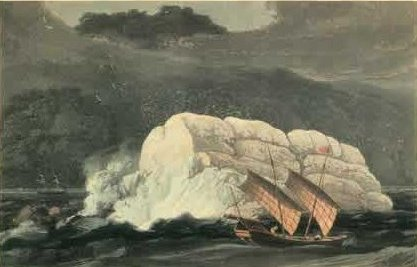
Thomas and William Daniell's etching of Pedra Branca before the building of Horsburgh Lighthouse, c. 1820

In addition, other 19th-century documents show that the Sultan of Johor exercised authority over the Orang Laut ("sea people") who inhabited the maritime areas of the Straits of Singapore and visited Pedra Branca. One of these was a letter of November 1850 by John Turnbull Thomson, the Government Surveyor of Singapore, which reported on the need to exclude the Orang Laut from Pedra Branca where Horsburgh Lighthouse was being built. Calling them a "half fishing half piratical sect", Thomson noted that they "frequently visit the rock so their visits should never be encouraged nor any trust put in them ... In the straits and islets of the neighbouring shores and islands many lives are taken by these people."

On 17 March 1824, the United Kingdom and the Netherlands signed the Anglo–Dutch Treaty of 1824. It divided the old Johor Sultanate into two new Sultanates: the new Sultanate of Johor, which would be under the British sphere of influence, and the Sultanate of Riau–Lingga under Dutch influence. Under Article XII of the Treaty, Britain agreed that "no British Establishment shall be made on the Carimon Isles, or on the Island of Bantam, Bintang, Lingin, or on any of the other Islands South of the Straits of Singapore ..." The islands and islets within the Straits fell within the British sphere of influence. This included Pedra Branca, which thus remained part of the territorial domain of the new Johor Sultanate.

=== 1840s to 1851: Construction of Horsburgh Lighthouse ===
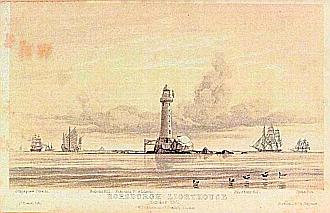
Horsburgh Lighthouse, a painting by John Turnbull Thomson (1821–1884) showing the island of Pedra Branca just after the completion of the lighthouse in 1851, which he designed.

Captain James Horsburgh, a Scottish hydrographer to the British East India Company who had prepared many charts and sailing instructions for the East Indies, China, New Holland, the Cape of Good Hope and other intermediate ports, died in May 1836. Merchants and mariners felt that the building of one or more lighthouses would be a fitting tribute to him, and in as early as November 1836 Pedra Branca was proposed as one of the preferred sites. By 1844, preference had been expressed for Romania Outer Island, or Peak Rock. Some time in November 1844, the Governor of the Straits Settlements, William John Butterworth, wrote to the Sultan and the Temenggung of Johor regarding the matter. His letters have not been found, but English translations of the replies, dated 25 November 1844, indicate that the Sultan and Temenggung favoured the proposal. In particular, the Temenggung wrote that "the [East India] company are at full liberty to put up a Light House there, or any spot deemed eligible". Three days later, on 28 November, the Governor wrote to the Secretary of the Government in India to recommend that the lighthouse be sited on Peak Rock. Among other things, he said that "[t]his Rock is part of the Territories of the Rajah of Johore, who with the Tamongong ... have willingly consented to cede it gratuitously to the East India Company", and enclosed the replies received from the Sultan and Temenggung. Although this was apparently the Governor's understanding of the situation, he did not communicate it to the Sultan and Temenggung. It is unclear whether the correspondence was limited to Peak Rock or extended to other potential sites for the lighthouse such as Pedra Branca, and whether the sovereignty of Johor over any place chosen for the lighthouse was ceded to the British Government or only a permission to build, maintain and operate a lighthouse was granted.

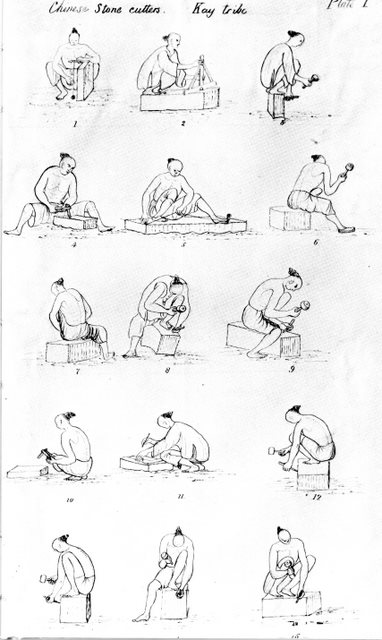
A sketch by Thomson showing Chinese stonecutters from the "Kay tribe" (that is, of Hakka origin) at work in a quarry on Pulau Ubin, an island off the northeast coast of Singapore, which supplied granite for the lighthouse on Pedra Branca.

On 22 August 1845, Governor Butterworth wrote again to the Government of India, indicating he trusted that construction of the lighthouse on Peak Rock would begin soon "as a light in that quarters is becoming daily of more paramount importance". Between 1824 and 1851, at least 16 sizeable vessels were wrecked in the vicinity of Pedra Branca and Point Romania (on the Johor coast). However, in April 1846, the Lords of the Admiralty in London informed the Court of Directors of the East India Company they were inclined to think that Pedra Branca was the best point for the lighthouse. John Thomson and Captain S. Congalton, commander of the East India Company's steamer called the Hooghly, carried out surveys in May and August. In a report dated 25 August, they said they were "decidedly of opinion that Pedra Branca is the only proper position for a Light to be placed ... for the safety of Shipping whether entering or departing for the Straits of Singapore ..." The following day, Governor Butterworth wrote to the Government of India stating that the Government "will at once perceive that Pedra Branca is the only true position" for the lighthouse. On 30 October 1846, the President in Council in India approved Pedra Branca as the site for the lighthouse. The East India Company gave its approval on 24 February 1847, and on 10 May of that year the Government of India asked Governor Butterworth to take measures for the construction of the lighthouse. There is no evidence that the authorities in Singapore thought it necessary or desirable to inform the Johor authorities of the decision about the siting of the lighthouse or to seek any consent for its erection.

Although the private subscribers wishing to commemorate Horsburgh had raised a sum which, with compound interest, came up to more than 7,400 Spanish dollars when it was paid over to the Singapore authorities, there was still a shortfall of funds for the building works. Thus, the Government of India, in agreement with the East India Company, authorised Governor Butterworth to prepare a law imposing a duty on vessels entering Singapore and asked him to take immediate measures to begin constructing the lighthouse. The Light Dues Act 1852 was duly enacted by the Governor-General of India in Council on 30 January 1852. Thomson, appointed by the Governor as the architect for the project, took charge of planning and supervising the construction of Horsburgh Lighthouse. Construction work began in late March or early April 1850. On Queen Victoria's birthday, 24 May 1850, the foundation stone was laid at a ceremony conducted by members of the newly founded Masonic Lodge Zetland in the East No. 749 and attended by the Governor, the commander of the Singapore garrison, a rear admiral and several foreign consuls. The construction of the lighthouse then continued till 21 October, and resumed after the monsoon in April 1851. Up to 50 workmen were involved, including Chinese carpenters and stonemasons and their Malay assistants, Indian quarrymen and convict labourers, a cook and his assistant, and six lascars to defend the island from attack by pirates. The pirates of the South China Sea were notorious – during the construction of Horsburgh Lighthouse nine Chinese labourers were killed in pirate raids. Building materials and supplies were brought by the Hooghly, supported by two gunboats and two lighters. Unless he was required elsewhere, Thomson stayed on the island to supervise the works. The ceremonial first lighting of the lamp was arranged for 27 September 1851, again attended by the Governor, Masons of the Zetland Lodge, foreign dignitaries, senior residents of Singapore and other notables; the Singapore Free Press reported: "A simultaneous rising [of the guests from the dinner table] announced that the process of illumination had commenced. Three hearty cheers welcomed the light, the meteor-like brilliancy of which will probably serve to guide the midnight path of the mariner for a thousand years to come." On 15 October the lighthouse was permanently turned on, and Thomson finally departed Pedra Branca for Singapore on the Hooghly on 18 November 1851.

=== 1852 to the 1970s ===
The Light Dues Acts of 1852 and 1854 (India) declared that Horsburgh Lighthouse and its appurtenances were the property of and vested in the East India Company. In 1867, the Straits Settlements, of which Singapore was a part, became a Crown Colony, and by the Straits Settlements Light-Houses Ordinance 1912, the lighthouse was vested in Singapore. After 1912, the duties levied on ships passing through the Singapore Strait were abolished; instead, the costs of the lighthouse were shared by the neighbouring states.

In 1946, following World War II, Singapore became a separate Crown Colony. The other Straits Settlements, Malacca and Penang, joined the Malay states (including Johor) to form the Malayan Union. The latter became the Federation of Malaya in 1948, and the Federation of Malaysia in 1963. On 17 June 1953, the Colonial Secretary of Singapore wrote to the British Adviser to the Sultan of Johor to clarify the status of Pedra Branca. He noted that the rock was outside the limits ceded by Sultan Hussein Shah and the Temenggung with the island of Singapore under the Treaty of Friendship and Alliance of 2 August 1824 they had entered into with the East India Company. However, the Colonial Government had been maintaining the lighthouse built on it, and "[t]his by international usage no doubt confers some rights and obligations on the Colony". He therefore asked if "there is any document showing a lease or grant of the rock or whether it has been ceded by the Government of the State of Johore or in any other way disposed of". The Acting State Secretary of Johor replied on 21 September that "the Johore Government does not claim ownership of Pedra Branca". This correspondence indicated that as of 1953 Johor understood it did not have sovereignty over Pedra Branca, which had therefore vested in the United Kingdom.

The Colony of Singapore became a self-governing state in 1959 and left the British Empire to join the Federation of Malaysia in 1963. Two years later, in 1965, Singapore became a fully independent republic. In 1959, in an official publication regarding meteorological information collected on Pedra Branca, Malaya listed Horsburgh Lighthouse as a "Singapore" station together with the Sultan Shoal and Raffles Lighthouses. The lighthouse on Pedra Branca was described in the same way in a joint Malaysian and Singaporean publication in 1966, the year after Singapore left the Federation. In 1967, when the two countries began reporting meteorological information separately, Malaysia ceased referring to Horsburgh Lighthouse. In maps published by the Malayan and Malaysian Surveyor General and Director of General Mapping in 1962, 1965, 1970, 1974 and 1975, the island was indicated with the word "(SINGAPORE)" or "(SINGAPURA)" under it. The same designation was used for an island that was unquestionably under Singapore's sovereignty. On the other hand, the designation was not used for Pulau Pisang, an island under Malaysian sovereignty on which Singapore operated a lighthouse.

Singapore replaced the original kerosene-fired lamp of Horsburgh Lighthouse with automated navigational lights in the 1970s. In 1972, 1973, 1974 and 1978, the Port of Singapore Authority (PSA) considered the feasibility of carrying out reclamation of about 5,000 square metres (54,000 sq ft) of land around Pedra Branca, but did not go ahead with the project. On 30 May 1977, with the permission of the PSA, the Republic of Singapore Navy installed a military rebroadcast station which it shared with the Republic of Singapore Air Force. Subsequently, the PSA installed a helipad on the eastern half of the island, and a communications tower for its Vessel Traffic Information System for the 900-odd ships that pass daily through the south and middle channels which are the main shipping channels of the eastern part of the Singapore Strait.

=== 1980s to present ===
In the 1980s, Malaysian Marine Police boats entered the waters around Pedra Branca on several occasions. However, both Malaysia and Singapore acted with restraint, the Singapore Navy having been given strict instructions not to escalate matters. In 1989, the then Prime Minister of Malaysia Mahathir Mohamad made an unannounced visit to the vicinity of the island. His boat was intercepted by Singapore naval vessels. To avoid an international incident, he directed his boat to leave.

With effect from 27 June 2002, Pedra Branca was declared a protected area within the meaning of the Protected Areas and Protected Places Act. Consequently, a permit from the Maritime and Port Authority of Singapore is required for access to the island, and unauthorised presence there is a criminal offence. On 6 October 2008, a Singaporean man, Roger Lee, was convicted of illegally landing on Pedra Branca. In court documents, he said he had gone to Batam, Indonesia, in 1998. He later married and started a family with an Indonesian woman, but she left him in 2007 due to his unstable income and inability to hold down a job. As he had illegally overstayed in Indonesia and had been cheated of his passport and other personal documents by a friend, Lee hatched a plan to pretend to be a lost fisherman in the hope that the Police Coast Guard would rescue him and take him back to Singapore. On 5 February 2008, he paid a boatman to transport him out to sea in a motorised sampan. As he did not see any coast guard or navy patrols he disembarked on Pedra Branca and was arrested by staff stationed there. Lee pleaded guilty to illegally entering Singapore via an unauthorised landing place. A second charge of being found in a protected place without permission was taken into consideration for sentencing purposes. In mitigation, Lee's pro bono lawyer said that there was no sign on Pedra Branca's warning against trespassing on the island. Lee was sentenced to six weeks' imprisonment.

Speaking at the Singapore Energy Conference on 4 November 2008, Minister Mentor Lee Kuan Yew mentioned that the Singapore Government had considered reclaiming land and building a nuclear power plant on Pedra Branca. Such a plant could not be built on the main island of Singapore as international standards require a safety zone of 30 kilometres (19 mi) around the plant. However, it was recognised that this was probably not feasible as Pedra Branca is less than 30 kilometres from the Malaysian coast.

On 5 July 2021, the Singapore Government announced plans to proceed with reclamation around Pedra Branca to improve maritime safety, and search and rescue (SAR) efforts in the surrounding waters. The works, scheduled to begin at the end of 2021, would expand Pedra Branca to 7 hectares from the existing 0.86 hectares today, and be carried out by the Housing and Development Board, a statutory board of the Ministry of National Development. New facilities planned for the island include berthing areas for ships to dock and logistical, administrative and communications buildings.

== Territorial dispute ==
=== International Court of Justice case ===
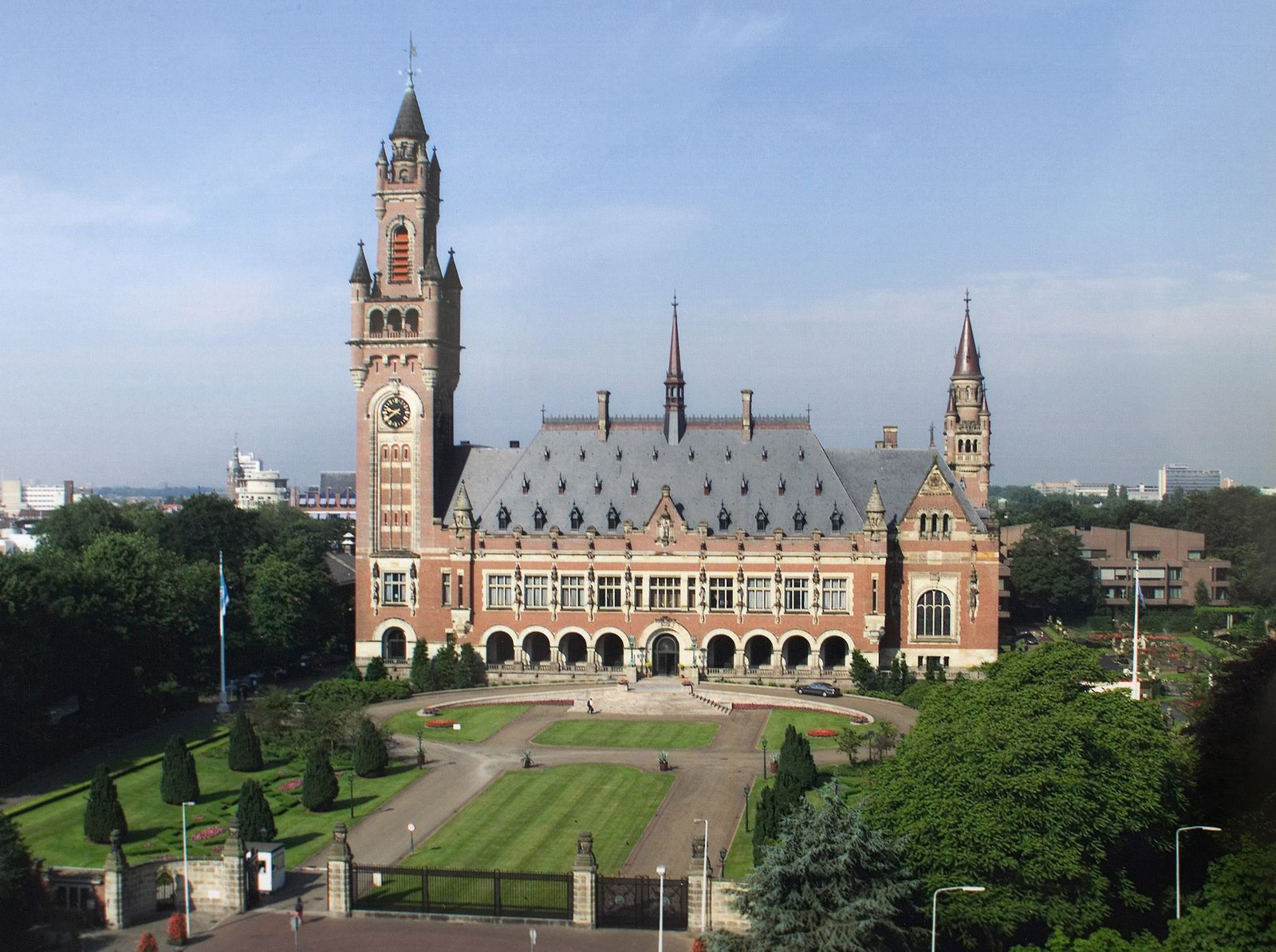
The Peace Palace in The Hague, Netherlands, the seat of the International Court of Justice

On 21 December 1979, the Director of National Mapping of Malaysia published a map entitled Territorial Waters and Continental Shelf Boundaries of Malaysia showing Pedra Branca to be within its territorial waters. Singapore rejected this claim in a diplomatic note of 14 February 1980 and asked for the map to be corrected. The dispute was not resolved by an exchange of correspondence and intergovernmental talks in 1993 and 1994. In the first round of talks in February 1993 the issue of sovereignty over Middle Rocks and South Ledge was also raised. Malaysia and Singapore, therefore, agreed to submit the dispute to the International Court of Justice (ICJ), signing a Special Agreement for this purpose in February 2003 and notifying the Court of it in July 2003. The case was heard at the Peace Palace in The Hague between 6 and 23 November 2007.

The ICJ delivered its judgment on 23 May 2008. It held that although Pedra Branca had originally been under the sovereignty of Johor, the conduct of Singapore and its predecessors à titre de souverain (with the title of a sovereign) and the failure of Malaysia and its predecessors to respond to such conduct showed that by 1980, when the dispute between the parties arose, sovereignty over the island had passed to Singapore. The relevant conduct on the part of Singapore and its predecessors included investigating marine accidents in the vicinity of the island, planning land reclamation works, installing naval communications equipment, and requiring Malaysian officials wishing to visit the island to obtain permits. In contrast, Johor and its successors had taken no action with respect to the island from June 1850 for a century or more. In 1953 the Acting Secretary of the State of Johor had stated that Johor did not claim ownership of Pedra Branca. All visits made to the island had been with Singapore's express permission, and maps published by Malaysia in the 1960s and 1970s indicated that it recognised Singapore's sovereignty over Pedra Branca.

Like Pedra Branca, the Sultan of Johor held the original ancient title to Middle Rocks. As Singapore had not exercised any rights as a sovereign over Middle Rocks, the ICJ determined that Malaysia retained sovereignty over this maritime feature. As for South Ledge, the ICJ noted that it fell within the apparently overlapping territorial waters of mainland Malaysia, Pedra Branca and Middle Rocks. As the Court had not been mandated to draw the line of delimitation with respect to the territorial waters of Malaysia and Singapore in the area in question, it simply held that sovereignty over South Ledge belonged to the state which owned the territorial waters in which it is located.

=== Reactions to ICJ decision ===
Although both Malaysia and Singapore had agreed to respect and accept the ICJ's decision, Malaysian Foreign Minister Rais Yatim later said his country had renewed its search for the letters written by Governor Butterworth to the Sultan and Temenggung of Johor seeking permission to build Horsburgh Lighthouse on Pedra Branca. He noted that the rules of the ICJ allowed a case to be reviewed within ten years if new evidence was adduced. In response, Singapore's Law Minister K. Shanmugam said that the city-state would wait to see what new evidence the Malaysian government could come up with.

A week after the delivery of the ICJ's judgment, the Foreign Ministry of Malaysia asked the Malaysian media to cease using the Malay word Pulau ("Island") for Pedra Branca and to refer to it as "Batu Puteh" or "Pedra Branca". On 21 July 2008, in response to questions from Singapore Members of Parliament about Pedra Branca, the Senior Minister of State for Foreign Affairs Balaji Sadasivan stated that the maritime territory around the island included a territorial sea of up to 12 nautical miles (22 km; 14 mi) and an Exclusive Economic Zone. This was condemned by Malaysia's Foreign Minister Rais Yatim as "against the spirit of Asean and the legal structure" as the claim was "unacceptable and unreasonable and contradicts the principles of international law". In response, a Singapore Ministry of Foreign Affairs spokesman said that Singapore first stated its claim to a territorial sea and Exclusive Economic Zone on 15 September 1980, and reiterated this claim on 23 May 2008 following the ICJ's judgment. Both statements had made clear that if the limits of Singapore's territorial sea or Exclusive Economic Zone overlapped with the claims of neighbouring countries, Singapore would negotiate with those countries to arrive at agreed delimitations in accordance with international law. In August 2008, Rais said Malaysia took the view that Singapore was not entitled to claim an Exclusive Economic Zone around Pedra Branca as it considered that the maritime feature did not meet internationally recognised criteria for an island, that is, land inhabited by humans that had economic activity.

At the National Day Awards in August 2008, Singapore announced that awards would be conferred on a number of people and organisations for their special contributions towards the Pedra Branca case. Chief Justice Chan Sek Keong; Tommy Koh, Ambassador-at-Large; and Justice Chao Hick Tin, then Attorney-General of Singapore, who appeared as counsel and advocates for Singapore, would respectively be awarded the Darjah Utama Temasek (Order of Temasek) (Second Class), the Darjah Utama Nila Utama (Order of Nila Utama) (First Class), and the Darjah Utama Bakti Cemerlang (Distinguished Service Order). The Pingat Jasa Gemilang (Meritorius Service Medal) would be conferred on Sivakant Tiwari s/o Thakurprasad Tiwari, Special Consultant to the International Affairs Division of the Attorney-General's Chambers. Twenty-two people from the Attorney-General's Chambers, Maritime and Port Authority of Singapore, Ministry of Defence, Ministry of Foreign Affairs, National Archives of Singapore, National Library Board, National University of Singapore and Supreme Court of Singapore would receive the Pingat Pentadbiran Awam (Public Administration Medal), the Pingat Kepujian (Commendation Medal) and the Pingat Berkebolehan (Efficiency Medal). The President's Certificate of Commendation would be issued to the Coastal Command (COSCOM), Republic of Singapore Navy; the Police Coast Guard, Singapore Police Force; the Centre for Heritage Services, Ministry of Defence; the National Archives of Singapore; and the Hydrographic Department, Maritime and Port Authority of Singapore. The awards were presented on 17 November 2008.

=== Resolution of outstanding issues ===
Malaysia and Singapore have established what they have named the Joint Technical Committee to delimit the maritime boundary in the area around Pedra Branca and Middle Rocks and to determine the ownership of South Ledge. Following a meeting on 3 June 2008, the Committee agreed that a technical sub-committee would be established to oversee the conduct of joint survey works to prepare the way for talks on maritime issues in and around the area. If any incident occurred in and around the waters of Pedra Branca, Middle Rocks and South Ledge, either side would provide humanitarian assistance to the vessels involved. Finally, both Malaysian and Singaporean fishermen could continue traditional fishing activities in those waters. In September 2008, the Joint Technical Committee reported that its Sub-Committee on Joint Survey Works was finalising technical preparations for a hydrographic survey that would provide data for future delimitation discussions. A Sub-Committee on Maritime and Airspace Management and Fisheries had also been formed, and after a meeting on 20 August 2008 it decided that traditional fishing activities by both countries should continue in waters beyond 0.5 nautical miles (0.9 km; 0.6 mi) off Pedra Branca, Middle Rocks and South Ledge. In October 2023, at the 10th Singapore-Malaysia Leaders' Retreat, Singapore's then-Prime Minister Lee Hsien Loong and Malaysia's Prime Minister Dato’ Seri Anwar Ibrahim released a joint statement saying that they looked forward to the resolution of the outstanding bilateral maritime boundary delimitation issues. The offices have yet to release the results of any follow-ups.

=== Malaysian application for review and withdrawal ===
On 2 February 2017, Malaysia applied to the ICJ pursuant to Article 61 of the Statute of the ICJ for the revision of the 2008 judgment on the basis of three documents it had obtained from The National Archives of the UK between August 2016 and January 2017. The documents were internal correspondence of Singapore's colonial government in 1958, an incident report submitted by a British naval officer in the same year, and a 1960s map of naval operations bearing annotations. The Malaysian Government said that these documents indicated that "officials at the highest levels in the British colonial and Singaporean administration appreciated that Pedra Branca/Pulau Batu Puteh did not form part of Singapore's sovereign territory" during the relevant period. However, according to Shahriman Lockman, a senior analyst at Malaysia's Institute of Strategic and International Studies, "there's very little precedent for revisions to ICJ judgments". Reports suggest that the timing of the application coincides with the upcoming elections in Malaysia, as the ruling Barisan Nasional Coalition, which is currently under pressure over the IMDb scandal, could "use the renewed legal fight over Pedra Branca as a means to show it was 'best placed to display strong leadership in the country's foreign policy so as to safeguard Malaysia's sovereignty'".

Singapore's Foreign Ministry said that a team including Attorney-General Lucien Wong, and Chan Sek Keong, S. Jayakumar and Tommy Koh (who had represented Singapore at the original ICJ hearing), had been appointed to study and respond to the claim. On 5 February 2017, Law and Home Affairs Minister K. Shanmugam commented that on a cursory examination of the documents without detailed legal advice, he did not see how the documents would make any difference to the ICJ's judgment.

On 30 Jun 2017, Malaysia applied to the ICJ to request an interpretation of the ICJ's 2008 judgment. This application is "separate and autonomous" from the 2 Feb application for the revision of the same judgment. The application invokes Article 60 of the Statute of the Court and Article 98 of the Rules of the Court. According to Malaysian Attorney-General Mohamed Apandi Ali, Malaysia and Singapore set up a Joint Technical Committee (JTC) for the implementation of the 2008 ICJ judgment. According to Malaysia, the JTC reached an impasse in November 2013, as both parties had been unable to agree over the meaning of the 2008 judgement as it concerns the South Ledge and the waters surrounding Pedra Branca. Explaining Malaysia's position, Malaysian Attorney-General Apandi said: "Malaysia considers that it is necessary to request an interpretation of the 2008 judgement from the ICJ as it would serve as a basis for the maintenance of orderly and peaceful relations between the parties in the management of their respective maritime zones and airspace in the future".

Singapore's Ministry of Foreign Affairs (MFA) noted in a press statement that ICJ's judgement was "final and without appeal", as well as "clear and unambiguous". As a result, MFA said: "Malaysia's request for the ICJ to interpret the judgement is puzzling. Singapore will therefore oppose Malaysia's application for interpretation, which we consider to be both unnecessary and without merit".

On 28 May 2018, the newly elected Malaysian Pakatan Harapan government withdrew both its applications for revision and interpretation of the 2008 judgment, a move which was welcomed by Singapore's MFA, thereby discontinuing both cases before ICJ. Furthermore, the Statute of the International Court of Justice only allows an application for revision to be made within 10 years after the 23 May 2008 judgement, which means further applications for revision are no longer possible. On 25 June 2019, Malaysia's Prime Minister Mahathir Mohamad reiterated Malaysia's acceptance of the ruling, citing it as an example of how ASEAN member states have worked together based on mutual respect.

== Politics ==
In 2019, Pedra Branca was added to the East Coast Group Representation Constituency (GRC) in the Parliament of Singapore for the 2020 general election. At the 2025 general election, it was placed under Pasir Ris–Changi GRC.

== See also ==
- Pulau Merambong
