= RMS Empress of Asia =

Canadian ocean liner

Coordinates: 1°14′N 103°39′E

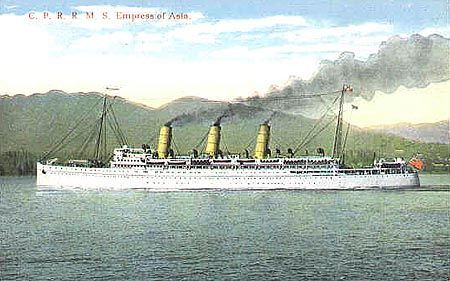
- Empress of Asia

History

United Kingdom
- Name: Empress of Asia
- Owner: Canadian Pacific Steamships
- Port of registry: Canada
- Builder: Fairfield Shipbuilding and Engineering, Govan, Scotland
- Launched: 23 November 1912
- Completed: June 1913
- Fate: Sunk by Japanese aircraft off Sultan Shoal on 5 February 1942

General characteristics
- Type: Ocean liner
- Tonnage: 16,909 GRT, 8,883 NRT
- Length: 570.2 ft (173.8m)
- Beam: 68.2 ft (20.8m)
- Draft: 42 ft (12.8m)
- Propulsion: Quadruple propellers, 4 x steam turbines by Builder, 3, 750 nhp
- Speed: 19 knots (35 km/h; 22 mph)
- Capacity: 200 first class, 100 second class and 800 third class passengers
- Notes: Special cargo arrangements for silk, an important Canadian Pacific commodity

RMS Empress of Asia was an ocean liner built in 1912–1913 by Fairfield Shipbuilding and Engineering at Govan on the Clyde in Scotland for Canadian Pacific Steamships.

As well as being a passenger liner in peacetime, Empress of Asia served as an armed merchant cruiser and a troopship in wartime. She was sunk during World War II by Japanese aircraft while transiting from Bombay to Singapore.

== Service history ==
Empress of Asia was built by Fairfield Shipbuilding and Engineering at Govan near Glasgow in Scotland Decorative plaster and wrought iron work in the dining room was carried out by H.H. Martyn & Co. She was launched on 23 November 1912, and christened by Mrs. Bosworth, wife of the vice-president of the Canadian Pacific Railway. She completed her maiden voyage in 1913.

In May 1914, Captain Samuel Robinson pushed the RMS Empress of Asia and her crew in setting a new world's record for both a single day's steaming (473 nautical miles) and for crossing the Pacific (nine days, two hours, and fifteen minutes).

=== World War I ===
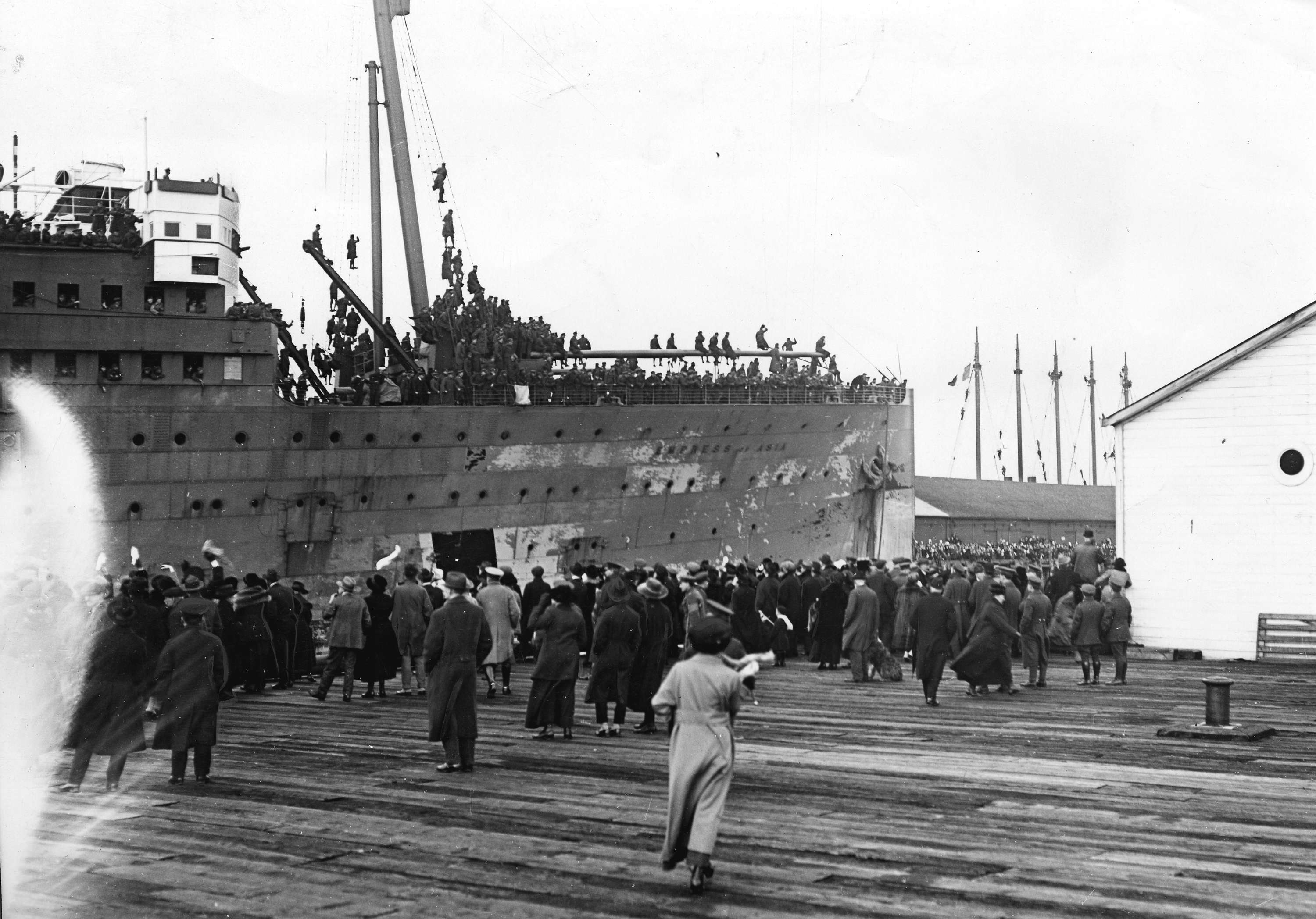
72nd Battalion, Seaforth Highlanders, C.E.F. disembarking from the Empress of Asia at the C.P.R. pier, Vancouver, in 1919

During the First World War, Empress of Asia was converted into an auxiliary cruiser at Hong Kong. She was armed with eight 4.7-inch (12 cm) guns and Royal Navy officers assumed command. Among her peacetime crew only those in the Royal Naval Reserve were retained.

She was deployed in Asia, in the Middle East and in the Atlantic, with Chinese, British Indian and Portuguese Indian (Goan) crew.

In late 1914, Empress of Asia was among the cruisers tasked with hunting the German light cruiser SMS Emden in the Indian Ocean east of Ceylon. The Empress of Asia transported wounded German prisoners from the sunken Emden to Colombo.

On 9 September 1918, Empress of Asia set sail from Hoboken, NJ bound for Liverpool carrying troops from the 86th Infantry Division's 331st Machine Gun Battalion, 311th Engineer Regiment and 311th Engineer Train. She arrived safely on 21 September 1918.

In 1919, Empress of Asia returned to Vancouver carrying the 72nd Battalion, Seaforth Highlanders of the Canadian Expeditionary Forces (CEF); and the men disembarked from the ship at the CPR pier.

=== Inter-war period ===
Amongst the celebrities who sailed in Empress of Asia was Bertrand Russell. The writer traveled from Yokohama to Vancouver in the late summer of 1921.

On 11 January 1926, Empress of Asia rammed the British coastal steamer Tung Shing in the Yangtze at Shanghai, China. Tung Shing sank with the loss of between five and ten lives.

Empress of Asia and Empress of Canada evacuated civilians from Shanghai in 1937 during the Second Sino-Japanese War.

=== World War II ===
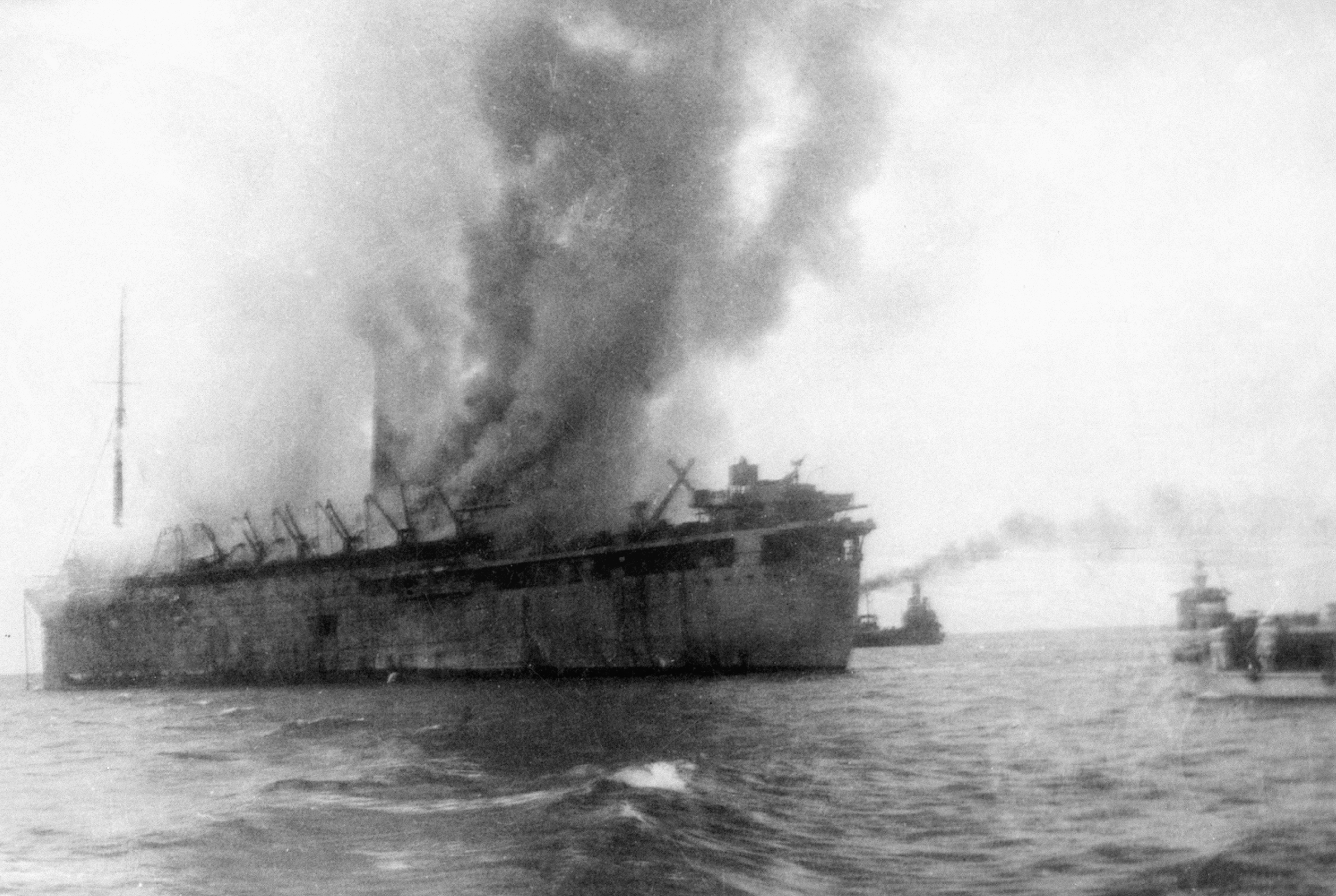
The Empress of Asia on fire and gradually sinking after being attacked by Japanese dive-bomber aircraft en route from India to Singapore. To the extreme right, the Sultan Shoal Lighthouse can be seen.

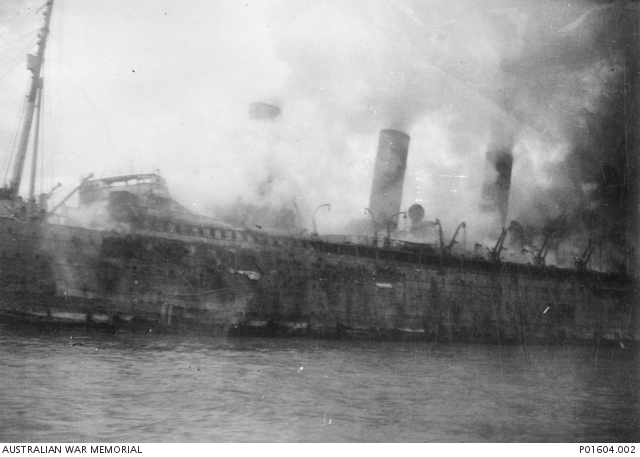
The starboard-side view of the burning vessel, showing extensive damage from the Japanese aerial-attack on the ship

Empress of Asia was requisitioned by the British Admiralty in January 1941, and sailed for Liverpool via the Panama Canal to the River Clyde for refitting as a troopship. For armament she received a 6-inch gun, a 3-inch gun HA, six 20 mm Oerlikons, eight Hotchkiss, Bofors guns, four PAC rockets and depth charges.

Her first task was to take soldiers of the Green Howards to Suez via the Cape of Good Hope to participate in the North Africa Campaign. From there she took Italian prisoners of war to Durban.

In September 1941, Empress of Asia sailed with the first convoy from North America to England which was escorted by ships of the United States Navy.

The final voyage of Empress of Asia began in November 1941, when she sailed from Liverpool carrying troops and supplies bound for Africa, Bombay and Singapore.

Empress of Asia was one of five ships that were carrying troops and military materiel and supplies to reinforce Singapore in the face of the rapid Japanese advance on the island following their successful conquest of British Malaya by the beginning of 1942. The convoy, designated BM.12, had come under an aerial attack in the Bangka Strait on 4 February 1942 and suffered only minor damage. On 5 February, as the convoy sailed into and entered the western approaches to Singapore, serious fierce attacks were pressed against it by the Japanese military south of the Sultan Shoal Lighthouse. Nine Japanese dive-bombers focused their airborne assault on the Empress of Asia. The second element of the convoy composed of the Empress of Asia, Félix Roussel and the City of Canterbury, escorted by HMAS Yarra and HMS Danae, and sighted vessels in the nearby waters with the Empress of Asia on fire, burning amidships, approaching Sultan Shoal. The ship anchored off the shoal with its onboard personnel gathered on the bow and the stern. The escort vessels, HMAS Wollongong, HMS Danae and HMIS Sutlej, stood by while HMAS Yarra's captain, Wilfred Harrington, carefully manoeuvered the bow of his ship alongside the flaming and severely-damaged liner's stern and rescued away 1804 survivors. HMAS Bendigo (J187), which had been in the vicinity, picked up 78 more, while the Wollongong saved the last two persons on the now-sinking ship, its master (captain) and chief-engineer. There were a total of 16 deaths on the Empress of Asia which resulted from when she was attacked and destroyed. The ship finally sank near the small island of Sultan Shoal (then located in the western harbour-approaches of Singapore, presently between the West Jurong and AlGas Anchorages beside Temasek Fairway) about 8 kilometres (5.0 mi) to the southwest of the western tip of the mainland of Singapore Island. Despite maritime-salvage efforts organized by Robert W. Rankin, all the military equipment and other crucial and vital supplies were lost and declared irrecoverable. Singapore would eventually fall to and come under the rule of Imperial Japan only ten days later (on 15 February 1942), which makes it difficult to speculate about what differences or changes to the outcome of the battle the Empress of Asia could have made if the ship had not been sunk. It was said that much of the vital military materiel and aid-supplies lost in the sinking of the ship would have been supplied and provided to the badly-equipped Singapore Chinese Anti-Japanese Volunteer Battalion as well as reinforcing and strengthening the rest of the poorly-equipped and ill-supplied British-commanded defending troops, aside from British troops, comprising Australian, Indian and Malayan soldiers.

The last convoy of evacuees leaving Singapore included SS Sing Kheng Seng of the Straits Shipping Company, carrying 45 crewmen from Empress of Asia along with an unknown number of others.

Leonard H. Johnston was chief mate of Empress of Asia when she went down. He took charge of 40 other young survivors and led his crew-mates safely to Fremantle, Australia. The journey involved sailing on three inter-island steamers to Sumatra, hiking over 100 miles across the island to catch a ferry to Java, and then a voyage from Batavia to Australia aboard a flat-bottomed river boat with Johnston serving as navigator. He was honored with the OBE for his exploits.

In April 2010, the shipwreck of the RMS Empress of Asia was found and in the possession for a subject of claim.

One of the ship's anchors was salvaged and subsequently put on display at the National Museum of Singapore in September 2015.

== See also ==
- CP Ships
- List of ocean liners
- List of ships in British Columbia

== Bibliography ==
- Frame, Tom. (2004). No Pleasure Cruise: The Story of the Royal Australian Navy. Sydney: Allen & Unwin ISBN 978-1-74114-233-4 (paper)
- Gill, G. Hermon (1957). Royal Australian Navy 1939–1942. Australia in the War of 1939–1945. Series 2 – Navy. Vol. 1. Canberra: Australian War Memorial. Archived from the original on 25 May 2009.
- Hammer, Joshua. (2006). Yokohama Burning: The Deadly 1923 Earthquake and Fire that Helped Forge the Path to World War II. New York: Simon & Schuster. ISBN 978-0-7432-6465-5 (cloth)
- Morison, Samuel Eliot. (2001). History of United States Naval Operations in World War II. Champaign, Illinois: University of Illinois Press. ISBN 0-252-06963-3
- Osborne, Richard; Spong, Harry & Grover, Tom (2007). Armed Merchant Cruisers 1878–1945. Windsor, UK: World Warship Society. ISBN 978-0-9543310-8-5.
- Russell, Bertrand. (2000). Uncertain Paths to Freedom: Russia and China, 1919–22. London: Routledge. ISBN 0-415-09411-9
