= Bedok Lighthouse =

Lighthouse in Bedok, Singapore

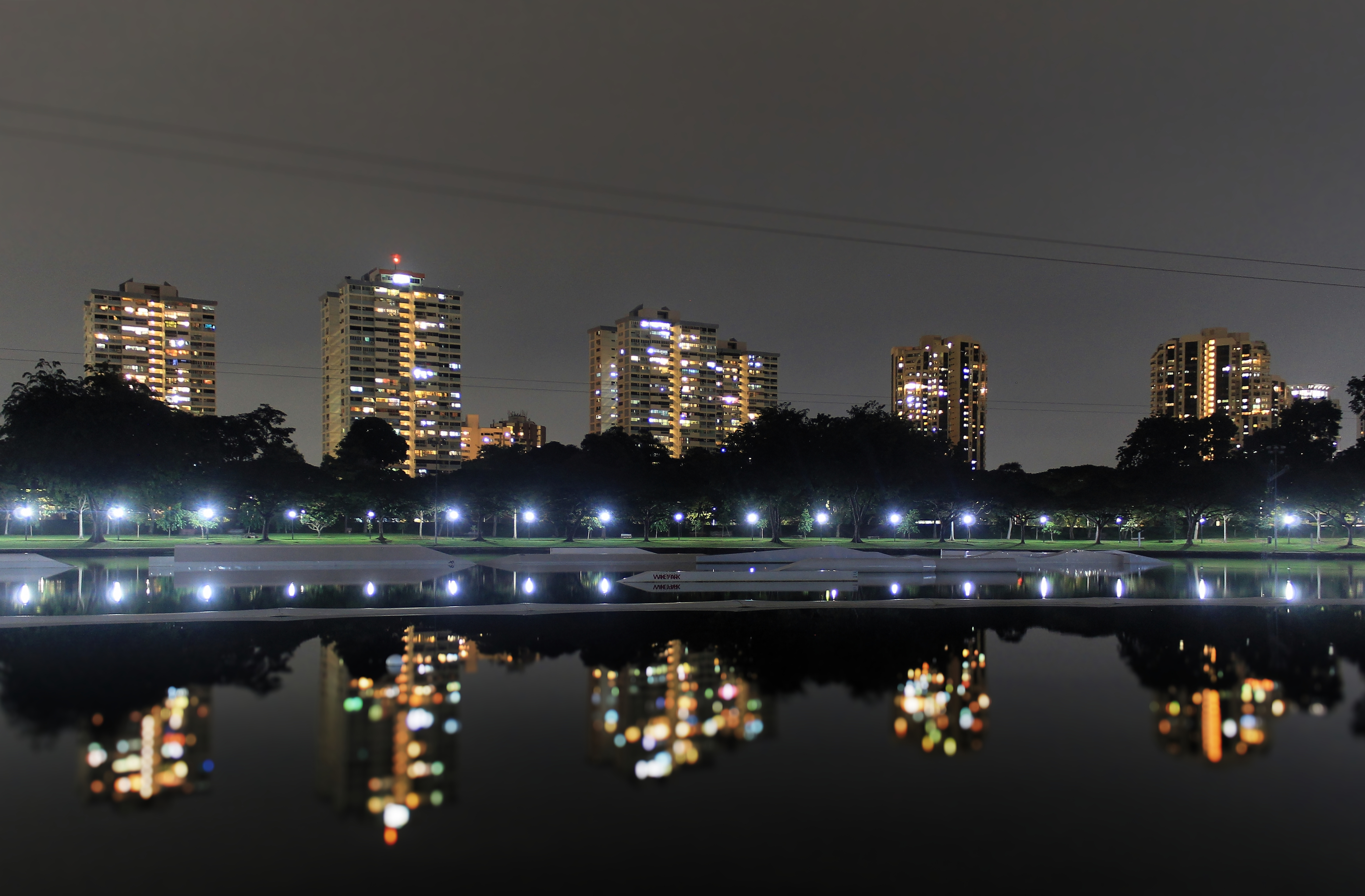
- Bedok Lighthouse (at the top of the second building from the left) as seen from East Coast Park
- Location: Bedok, Singapore
- Coordinates: 1°18′33″N 103°55′58″E

Tower
- Automated: 1978
- Height: 76 m (249 ft)
- Shape: Hut
- Markings: Red
- Operator: Maritime and Port Authority of Singapore (MPA)

Light
- First lit: 1978
- Light source: Lamp
- Intensity: 600,000
- Range: 42 km (26 mi; 23 nmi)
- Characteristic: White flash every 5 seconds

Bedok Lighthouse (Note: Chinese: 勿洛灯塔; pinyin: Wùluò dēngtǎ; Malay: Rumah Api Bedok; Tamil: பிடோக் கலங்கரை விளக்கம்; romanisation: Piṭōk kalaṅkarai viḷakkam) is an automated lighthouse in Bedok, Singapore. First announced in March 1978, Bedok Lighthouse commenced operations on 9 August 1978 to replace the Fullerton Lighthouse. Initially operated by the Port of Singapore Authority (PSA), the Maritime and Port Authority of Singapore (MPA) took over operations of the lighthouse in February 1996. Bedok Lighthouse is located on top of a residential building 76 metres (249 ft) above sea level.

== History ==
On 20 March 1978, it was announced by the Port of Singapore Authority (PSA) that a lighthouse in Bedok would be built to replace the Fullerton Lighthouse, as the latter was obscured by the development of high-rise buildings in the Marina Bay area. Equipment for the Bedok Lighthouse was expected to be fitted in the middle of May with at a cost of S$175,000 (1978) (US$76,956.06). However, the equipment's delivery from the United Kingdom was delayed, with the expected delivery date being extended to August. The lighthouse began operation on 9 August 1978 and cost S$225,000 (1978) (US$98,943.5) to build; the Fullerton Lighthouse continued to operate until the end of that year.

The maintenance and provision of lighthouses in Singapore was transferred to the Maritime and Port Authority of Singapore (MPA) on 2 February 1996, with the PSA later privatised on 1 October 1997. In February 2014, a tender call was made by the MPA for the construction of a new lighthouse on top of a Housing and Development Board flat in Marine Terrace, which was to replace the Bedok Lighthouse and expected to be operational by the third quarter of 2015. However, as of 2022, the Bedok Lighthouse is still operational. (Note: Bedok Lighthouse is listed as one of the reference points that vessels can use to report to the MPA.)

== Details ==
Bedok Lighthouse is an automated lighthouse on top of a 25-storey executive flat at Lagoon View, Marine Parade Road, which is located in the Bedok area of Singapore. Operated and maintained by the Hydrographic Division of the Maritime and Port Authority of Singapore (MPA), it is 76 metres (249 ft) above sea level and has a 600,000 candela lamp with a visibility of 42 kilometres (26 mi). The lamp cannot be seen, nor can the lighthouse's sound equipment be heard by residents of nearby buildings. It is monitored by a telegraph line from the Port Operations Room in the PSA Towers and has a skeleton crew to prevent vandalism. The lighthouse was chosen to be automated as it would reduce manpower. This also led to the automation of other lighthouses in Singapore. Bedok Lighthouse's light characteristic is one white flash every 5 seconds (Fl.W. 5s) that is visible for 20 nautical miles (37 km; 23 mi). Its structure has been described as a "red hut" in the United States National Geospatial-Intelligence Agency's list of lights. Bedok Lighthouse is Singapore's first fully autonomous lighthouse as well as the first to be located on top of a residential building in mainland Singapore.

== See also ==
- List of lighthouses in Singapore
