= List of lighthouses in Singapore =

This is a list of lighthouses in Singapore.

== Lighthouses ==
Name	Image	Location Coordinates	Year built	Tower height	Focal height	Range nml	Admiralty number
Horsburgh Lighthouse		Pedra Branca; 1.33028°N 104.40740°E	1851	34 m (112 ft)	31 m (102 ft)	20 nmi (37 km)	F1820
Raffles Lighthouse		Pulau Satumu; 1.16010°N 103.74008°E	1855	29 m (95 ft)	32 m (105 ft)	20 nmi (37 km)	F1693
Sultan Shoal Lighthouse		Sultan Shoal; 1.23968°N 103.64975°E	1896	18 m (59 ft)	20 m (66 ft)	15 nmi (28 km)	F1684
Fort Canning Lighthouse		Fort Canning Hill; 1.29220°N 103.84764°E	1903	24 m (79 ft)	36 m (118 ft)	Inactive	F1695
Fullerton Light		Fullerton Hotel; 1.28611°N 103.85278°E	1958	Unknown	Unknown	Inactive	Unknown
Bedok Lighthouse		Bedok; 1.30884°N 103.93286°E	1978	76 m (249 ft)	76 m (249 ft)	20 nmi (37 km)	F1733
Berlayer Point		Labrador Park; 1.26241°N 103.80502°E	1930	7 m (23 ft)	8 m (26 ft)	4 nmi (7 km)	F1702
Johor Strait		Raffles Marina, Tuas; 1.34435°N 103.63391°E	Unknown	12 m (39 ft)	15 m (49 ft)	Unknown	F1681

== See also ==
- Lists of lighthouses and lightvessels
- List of tallest buildings in Singapore
