= Robert William Rankin =

Royal Australian Navy officer (1907–1942)

Robert Rankin
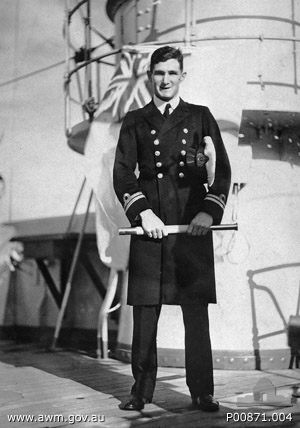
- Robert Rankin as a lieutenant in 1936.
- Born: 3 June 1907; Cobar, New South Wales
- Died: 4 March 1942 (aged 34); Indian Ocean
- Military career
- Allegiance: Australia
- Branch: Royal Australian Navy
- Service years: 1921–1942
- Rank: Lieutenant commander
- Commands: HMAS Yarra
- Conflicts: Second World War; Battle of the Mediterranean; Battle of the Atlantic; Battle of the Indian Ocean; Sinking of HMAS Yarra †

Robert William Rankin (3 June 1907 – 4 March 1942) was a Royal Australian Navy officer who was killed in action during the Second World War. He is one of six people to have had a Collins class submarine named after him.

== Early life ==
Rankin was born in Cobar, New South Wales.

== Naval career ==
Rankin entered the Royal Australian Naval College in 1921. He gained his Colours in Rugby, and prizes for mathematics and engineering.

Graduating in 1924, he joined his first ship, the cruiser HMAS Brisbane, in 1925. He completed the Junior Officers War Course, at Greenwich, in Britain, graduating as one of six sub-lieutenants who "received their Lordship’s appreciation of essays written". Serving in a range of ships, in the normal style of developing his general abilities, he was promoted to Lieutenant in 1929, and ended the 1920s with a posting as Assistant Torpedo Officer in the cruiser HMAS Canberra, where he also gained his watchkeeping certificate. He then was posted to HMAS Anzac. He applied to specialise in Communications, without success.

A shore posting to HMAS Cerberus followed, and by January 1934 Rankin was specialising in surveying, appointed as Assistant Surveyor 4th Class

Rankin joined HMAS Moresby on 18 January and assisted in charting the waters of Australian and New Guinea. In 1936 he expressed a desire to return to general duties, despite having gained his qualification as Assistant Surveyor 3rd Class the previous July. This was denied, with the order to complete another "season" of surveying.

Promotion to lieutenant commander followed in August, 1937. He was married in that year, to Mary Broughton, a trainee nurse based on Thursday Island, in Brisbane, in a glittering affair keenly reported in the local newspapers, which featured Rankin's naval officer friends – who called him 'Oscar' – forming an "arch of swords", for their friend and his bride to walk under as they entered the reception.

On 30 March 1938 he was posted to Britain, to join HMS Gleaner, a minesweeper, for surveying duties. Gaining a step in his survey career as Assistant Surveyor 2nd Class in July 1938, Rankin remained with Gleaner until 11 September 1939, when he was posted to the shore training establishment of HMS Dryad, for a navigating course. In July his daughter Patricia was born, but she and her mother had to be evacuated to Australia as the war commenced.

On 14 November 1939 Rankin was made the first Lieutenant and navigator of the repair ship HMS Resource. The ship was a large vessel of 12, 300 tons displacement, and 581 men on board. Serving in the Mediterranean, generally around Malta and Alexandria, Resource was not a fighting unit but an essential one nevertheless, for the Med was seeing the initial fleet actions of the war, with substantial fighting between the Allies and their enemies: the two Axis powers of Germany and Italy. Resource was much involved with the evacuation of battle survivors from Greece, and Rankin was complimented on his success at raising their morale.

Rankin served with Resource until 11 September 1941. His report on posting commented again in glowing terms and gave Rankin the credit for the successful esprit de corps on board. He had also apparently served with "a difficult Wardroom" with success.

Rankin was posted back to Australia arriving in September 1941. He was to carry out a survey of Pittwater, north of Sydney. Although this might have been thought to have been cancelled due to his not having seen his wife and child for a considerable time, the war took priority. He completed the survey in December 1941: the Australian Hydrographic Service today still has the completed work in what is known as a "fairsheet", with his signature above the words "in charge of survey". The survey is of central Pittwater and was completed in support of a proposed torpedo firing range with facilities at Taylors Point. The range was subsequently built and used for several decades.

In early 1942, following the outbreak of war with Japan, he was posted to the sloop HMAS Yarra. On 5 February 1942, while under air attack near Singapore, Yarra took on board 1,804 people from the SS Empress of Asia, a troopship which had caught fire. He was commended for his actions during the rescue.

Rankin assumed command of Yarra on 11 February and was mainly given the task of escort duties around the Dutch East Indies. At 6.30am on 4 March, while escorting a small convoy from Java to Australia, Yarra encountered a Japanese naval force comprising three cruisers and two destroyers. Rankin immediately transmitted a sighting report, ordered the convoy to scatter, and placed Yarra between the enemy and the convoy. The sloop made smoke and engaged the vastly superior Japanese force, with her 4-inch guns. Rankin gave the order to abandon ship at around 8 am. A direct hit on the bridge killed him shortly afterwards. Of the 151 on aboard Yarra, only 13 were rescued.

== Memorials and tributes ==
In honour of Robert Rankin the 6th and final Collins class submarine, HMAS Rankin was named in his honour. The ship's motto is "Defend the Weak", a reference to the efforts of Robert Rankin and Yarra to defend the unarmed convoy ships.

A group of Australian naval historians and others are campaigning Rankin to be awarded a posthumous Victoria Cross (as was awarded to Captain Edward Fogarty Fegen of HMS Jervis Bay, and to Lieutenant Commander Gerard Broadmead Roope of HMS Glowworm, for similarly defending convoys against hopeless odds). A website has been set up for the campaign.

A plaque in his memory, is at the base of a tree, in Memorial Ave, Merrylands, NSW (Outside the Uniting Church).
