= Mount Thomson (New Zealand) =

Mountain in New Zealand

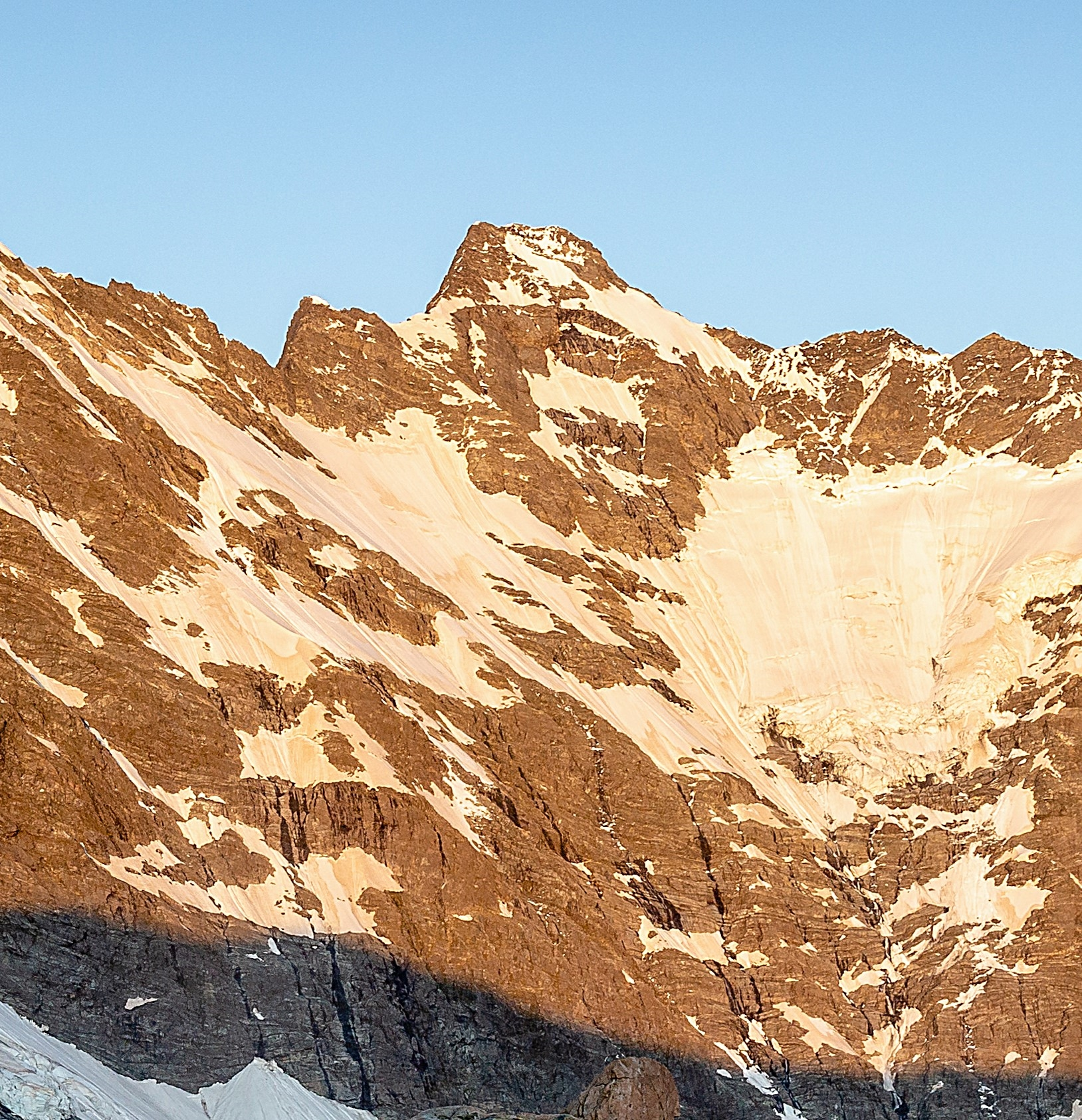
- East aspect, viewed from Mueller Hut

Highest point
- Elevation: 2,642 m (8,668 ft)
- Prominence: 178 m (584 ft)
- Isolation: 1.68 km (1.04 mi)
- Coordinates: 43°42′23″S 170°01′22″E

Naming
- Etymology: John Turnbull Thomson

Geography
- Location within New Zealand
- Interactive map of Mount Thomson
- Location: South Island
- Country: New Zealand
- Region: Canterbury / West Coast
- Protected area: Aoraki / Mount Cook National Park; Westland Tai Poutini National Park
- Parent range: Southern Alps
- Topo map: Topo50 BX15

Climbing
- First ascent: February 1914

Mount Thomson is a 2,642-metre-elevation (8,668-foot) mountain in New Zealand.

== Description ==
Mount Thomson is set on the crest or Main Divide of the Southern Alps and is situated on the boundary shared by the West Coast and Canterbury Regions of South Island. This peak is located six kilometres (3.7 mi) west-northwest of Mount Cook Village and set on the boundary shared by Aoraki / Mount Cook National Park and Westland Tai Poutini National Park. Precipitation runoff from the mountain drains west into the headwaters of the Douglas River and east to the Hooker River. Topographic relief is significant as the summit rises 1,450 metres (4,757 feet) above the Mueller Glacier in two kilometres. The nearest higher neighbour is Mount Sefton, three kilometres to the north-northeast. The mountain's toponym was applied by Gerhard Mueller to honour John Turnbull Thomson (1821–1884), Chief Surveyor of Otago who later became the first Surveyor General of New Zealand. This mountain's toponym has been officially approved by the New Zealand Geographic Board.

== Climbing ==
Climbing routes with the first ascents:

- Original Route – Otto Frind, Conrad Kain – (February 1914)
- Northern Exit – Otto Von Allmen, Paul Von Kanel – (January 1973)
- Left Rib – Aat Vervoorn, Dave White – (February 1973)
- West Ridge – FA unknown

== Climate ==
Based on the Köppen climate classification, Mount Thomson is located in a marine west coast (Cfb) climate zone, with a subpolar oceanic climate (Cfc) at the summit. Prevailing westerly winds blow moist air from the Tasman Sea onto the mountains, where the air is forced upward by the mountains (orographic lift), causing moisture to drop in the form of rain or snow. This climate supports the Douglas, Frind, Donne, and Fyfe glaciers surrounding the peak. The months of December through February offer the most favourable weather for viewing or climbing this peak.

== Gallery ==
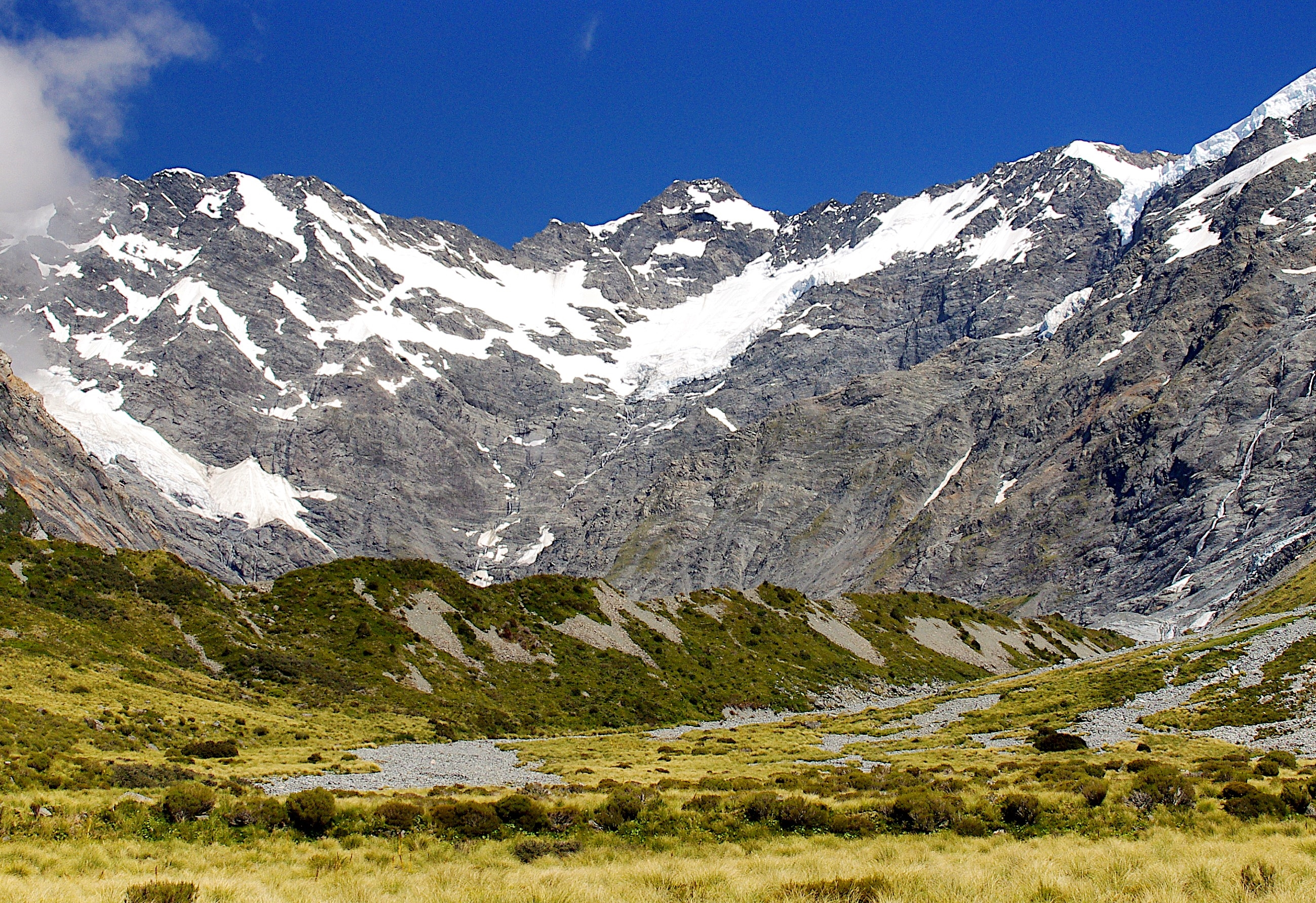
East aspect of Mount Thomson viewed from Hooker Valley Track

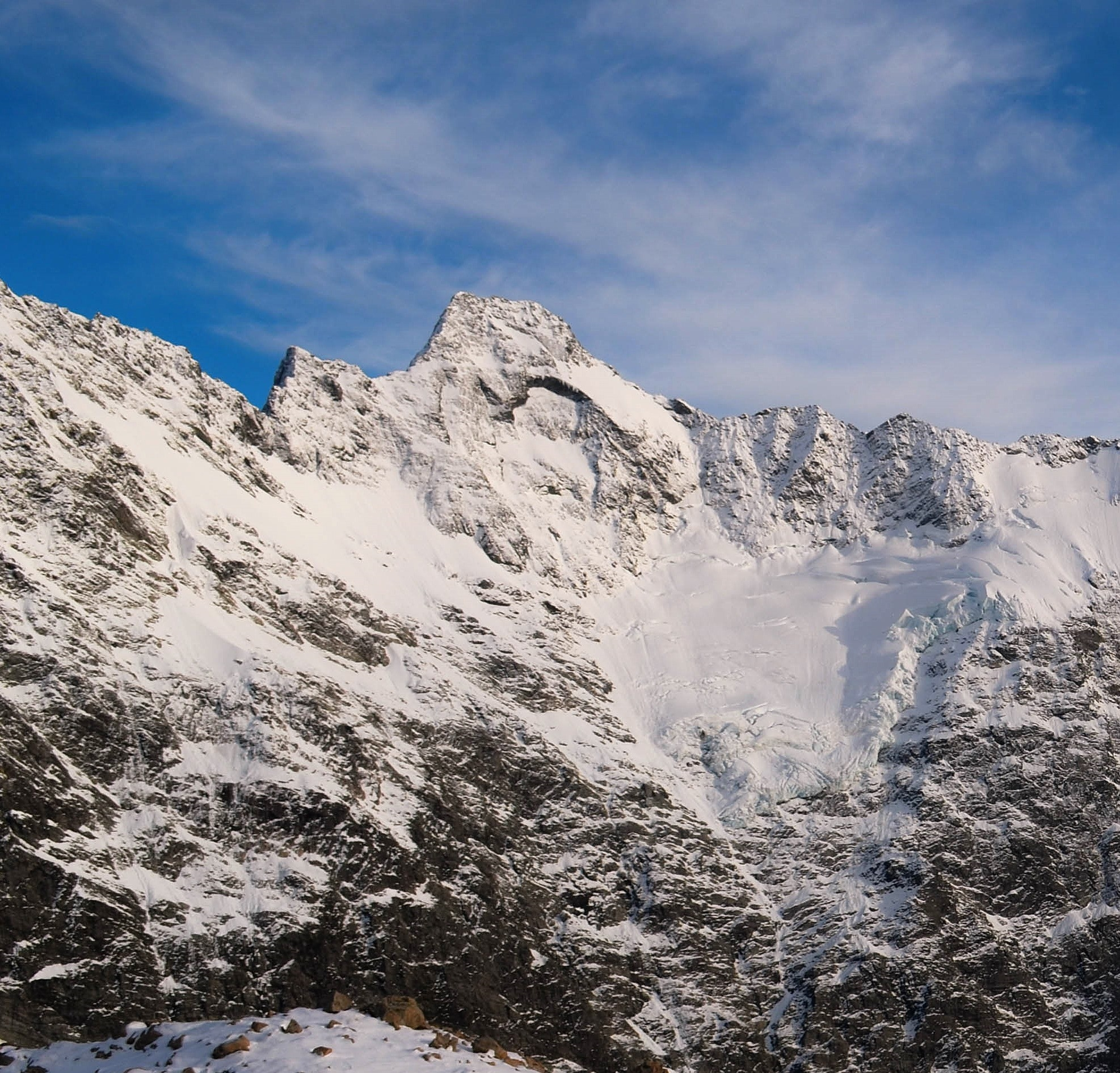
East face

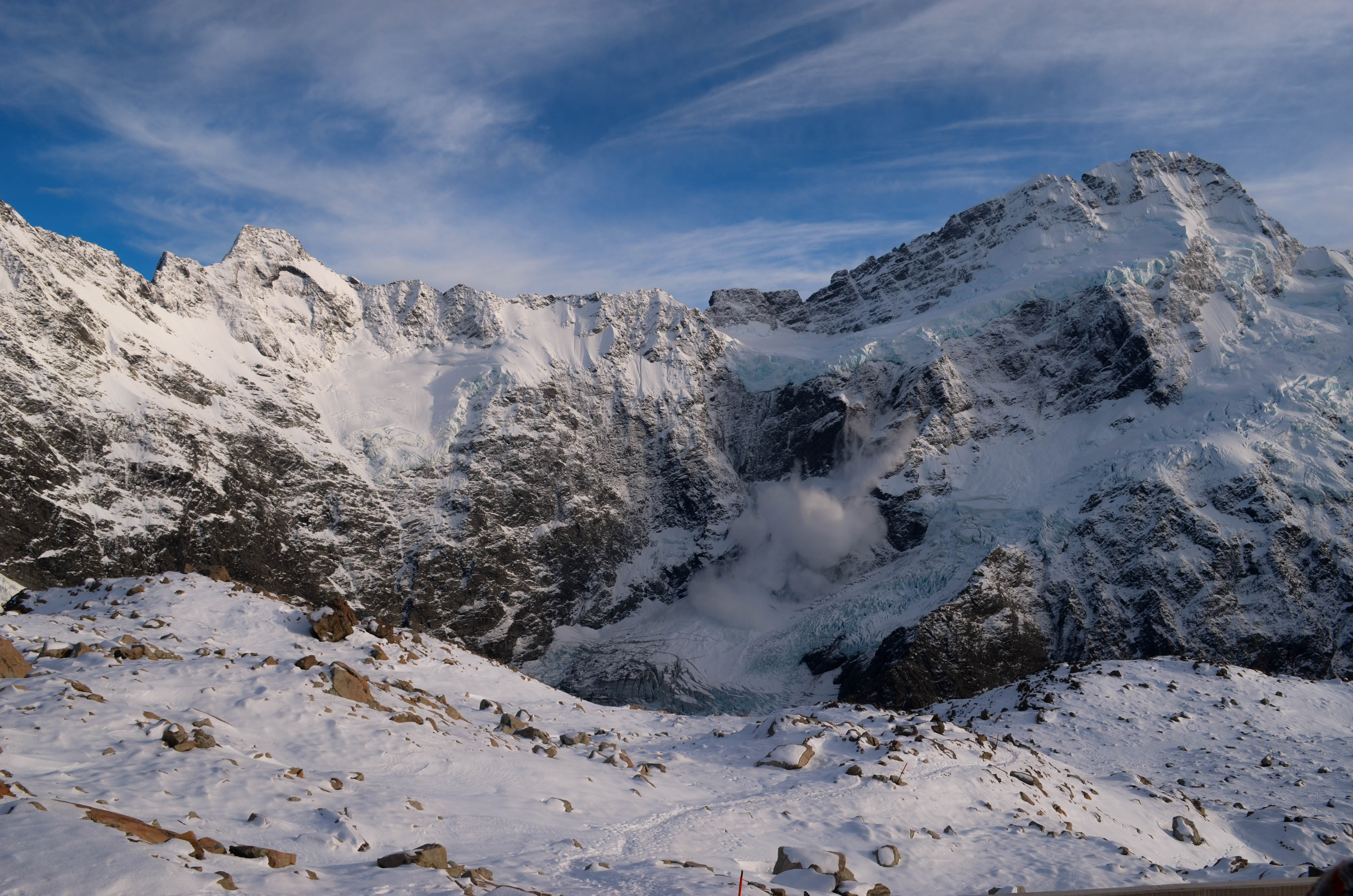
Thomson (left) and Sefton (right) viewed from Mueller Hut

== See also ==
- List of mountains of New Zealand by height
