= John Turnbull Thomson =

British engineer and artist active in Singapore (1821–1884)

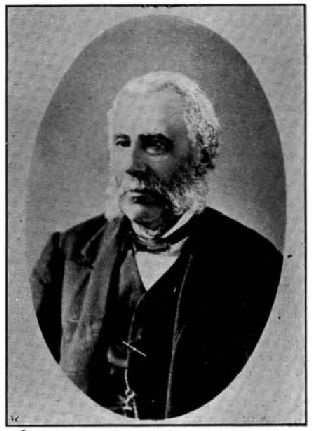
Picture of John Turnbull Thomson

John Turnbull Thomson (10 August 1821 – 16 October 1884) was a British civil engineer and artist who played an instrumental role in the development of the early infrastructure of nineteenth-century Singapore and New Zealand. He lived the last 28 years of his life in New Zealand, and prior to that 15 years in the Malay Straits and Singapore.

== Early life, family and education ==
Thomson was born at Glororum, Northumberland, England, the third child of Alexander Thomson and his wife, Janet, née Turnbull. After his father was killed in a hunting accident in 1830, the young Thomson and his mother went to live in Abbey St. Bathans, Berwickshire. He was educated at Wooler and Duns Academy, later spending some time attached to Marischal College, Aberdeen, and Edinburgh University before studying engineering at Peter Nicholson's School of Engineering at Newcastle-on-Tyne.

== Career ==
Thomson arrived in the Malay Straits in 1838 and was employed by the East India Survey. In 1841 he was appointed Government Surveyor at Singapore and in 1844 became Superintendent of Roads and Public Works.

He was responsible for the design and construction of a number of notable engineering works including bridges, roads, and hospitals. He conducted the allotment survey of Singapore, the topographical survey of the island of Singapore and its dependencies, and the marine survey of the Straits of Singapore and the east coasts of Johore and Penang. His outstanding achievement was the erection of the Horsburgh Lighthouse on Pedra Branca.

In 1853 his health failed and he returned to England, where he studied modern engineering techniques and travelled widely through Britain and the Continent inspecting engineering works.

Early in 1856 he emigrated to New Zealand, where he worked as Chief Surveyor of the Otago Province until 1873. From 1876 until 1879 he was Surveyor-General of New Zealand. He was also the original surveyor of the city of Invercargill.

== Legacy in Singapore ==
During his government service in Singapore, Thomson was responsible for many projects:

- Thomson's 1852 report on Singapore's water supply led in 1862 to approval of the Thomson Reservoir, now MacRitchie Reservoir.
- He made an elaborate survey of the Straits of Singapore, in conjunction with Captain Congalton who was largely responsible for clearing pirates from Malayan waters. He also surveyed Keppel Harbour. In 1829, he surveyed the Tombs of the Malayan Princes.
- He carried out repairs and lowering of Coleman Bridge.
- He was the architect and builder of:
  - Horsburgh Lighthouse on Pedra Branca,
  - Hajjah Fatimah Mosque,
  - the spire for St. Andrew's Cathedral,
  - Dalhousie Obelisk, a monument,
  - European Seaman's Hospital,
  - the first bridge across the Kallang River, known as Thomson Bridge, and
  - Tan Tock Seng Hospital at Serangoon Road.

Several extant places, roads and buildings in Singapore are named after J.T. Thomson. These include:

Area

- Thomson, a region in central Singapore

Roads

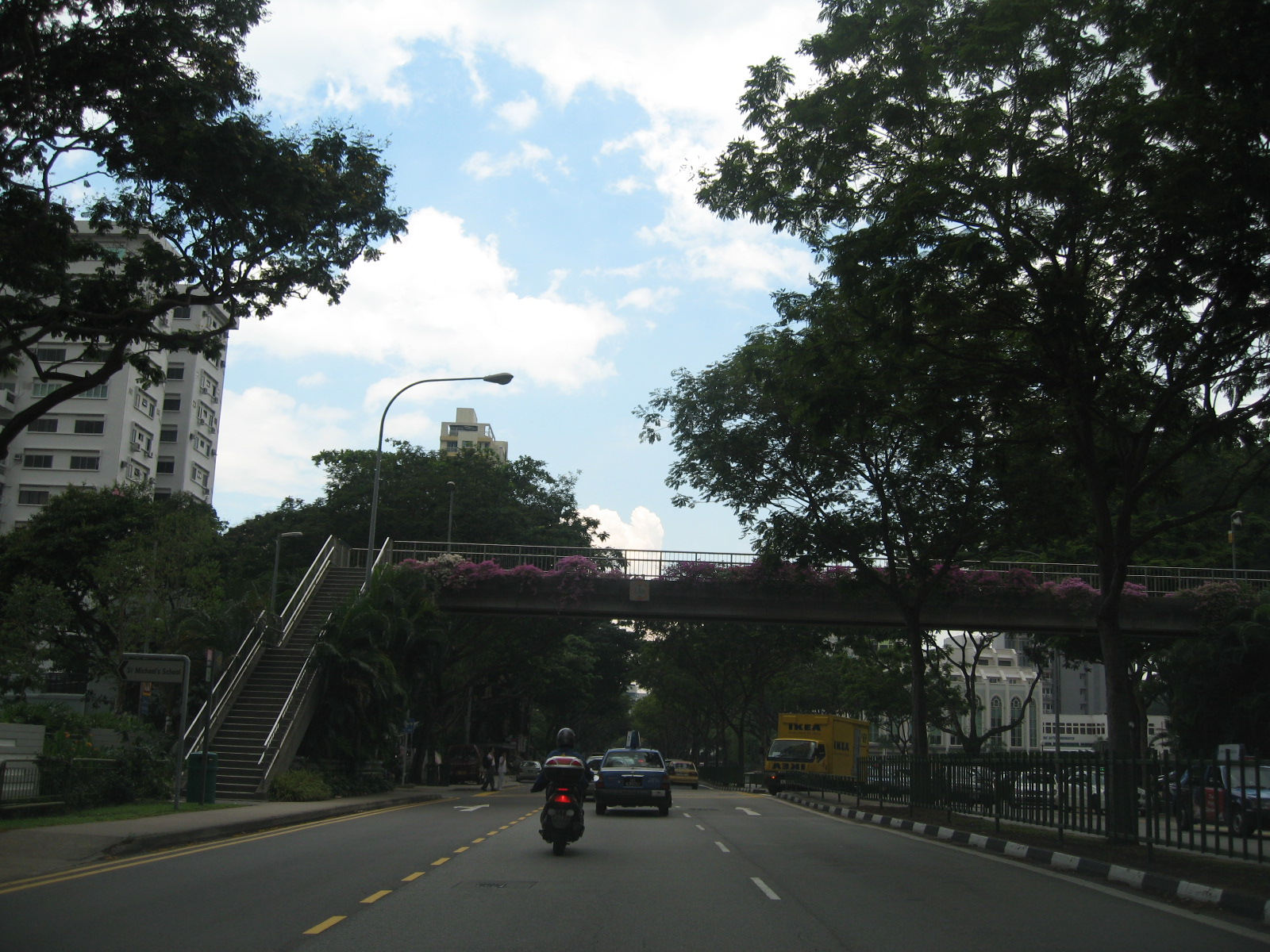
Thomson Road, Singapore

- Thomson Road, the arterial road that runs through the Thomson area
- Jalan Lembah Thomson
- Old Upper Thomson Road
- Thomson Close
- Thomson Green
- Thomson Heights
- Thomson Hill
- Thomson Hills Drive
- Thomson Lane
- Thomson Ridge
- Thomson Terrace
- Thomson View
- Thomson Walk
- Upper Thomson Road

Amenities

- Thomson Medical Centre
- Thomson/Whitley Park

== Legacy in New Zealand ==
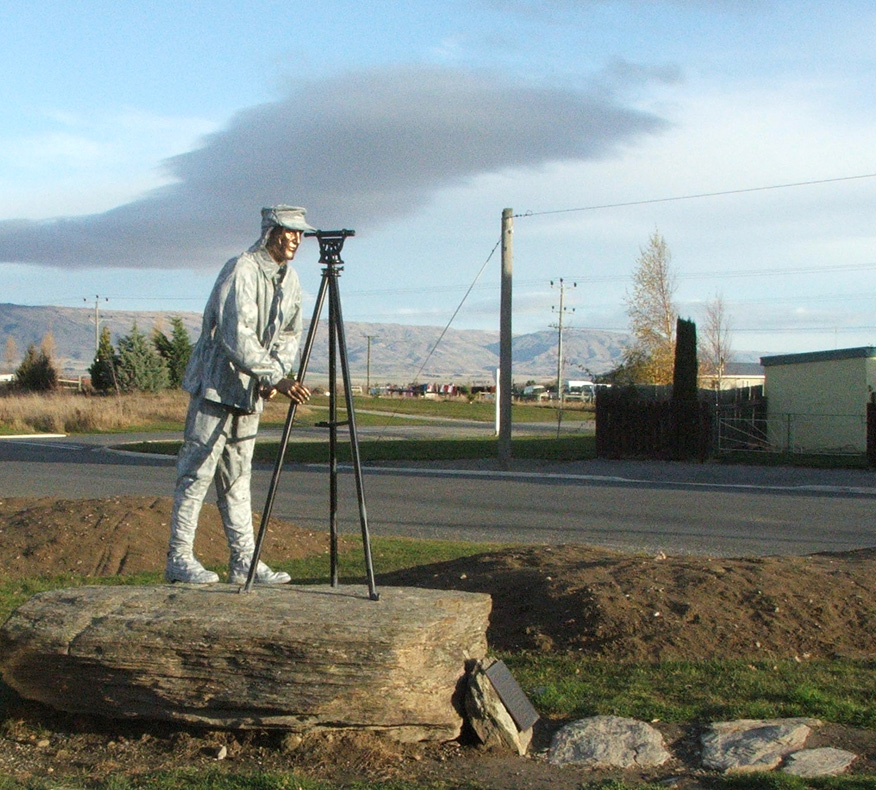
Thomson memorial in Ranfurly, New Zealand

From 1856 until 1858 Thomson surveyed and explored large sections of the interior of the South Island, covering most of the southern half of the island. Many names in the area indicate Thomson's Northumbrian background, though there is a widespread belief that the naming of many places was through a disagreement with the New Zealand surveying authorities. It has long been suggested that Thomson originally intended to give Māori names to places, but these names were refused. Thomson gave Northumbrian names to many places. Though unconfirmed, he may have named the town of Middlemarch after the Middle March region of his native Northumberland, although another theory suggests the surveyor's wife was reading the George Eliot novel of the same name. Sometimes he gave places a form of the Northumbrian name for an animal, as with names such as Kyeburn, Gimmerburn, Hoggetburn, and Wedderburn. The area where those places are found has been referred to as "Thomson's Barnyard".

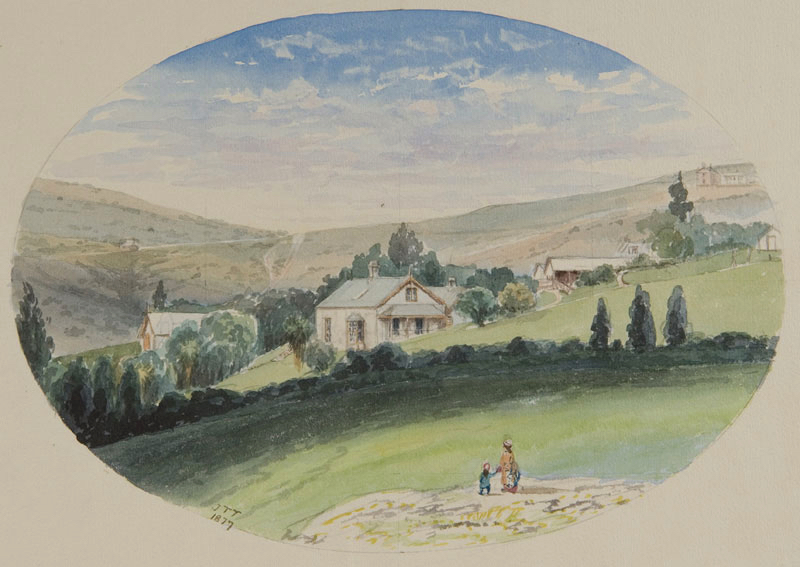
One of Thomson's water colours c. 1865

Thomson was a founder of the Otago and Southland Institutes of New Zealand, to which he contributed numerous papers on scientific subjects including ethnological studies. Through his knowledge of Hindustani and Malay, he became interested in comparative linguistics and developed a theory of racial diffusion based on philological evidence.

He was also a keen amateur painter of landscapes, working mostly in oils. From a topographical viewpoint his paintings are of great interest today.

Thomson married Jane Williamson of Dunedin at "Kaikorai Bank", Dunedin on the 7 October 1858. He died at his home in Invercargill on 16 October 1884.

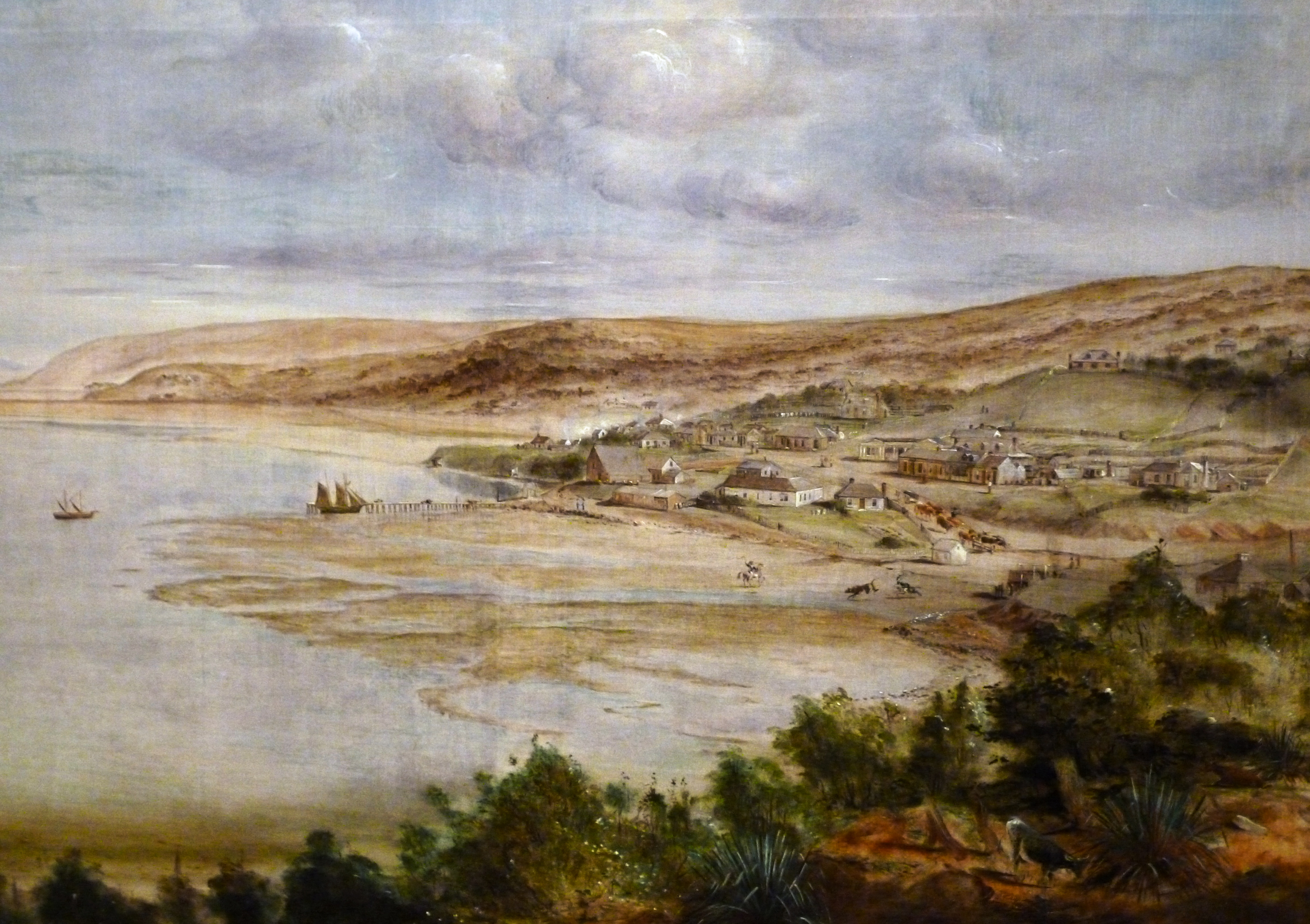
Thomson's painting of Dunedin 1856

Thomson was responsible for the planning of the city of Invercargill in Southland, New Zealand and his mausoleum is in the St. John's Cemetery in Waikiwi, Invercargill. One of the city's major parks is Turnbull Thomson Park. He surveyed many South Island towns prior to development. His descendants have written numerous books which contain authoritative information on his life in New Zealand. Thomson's great-grandson, John Hall-Jones, was a historian specializing in the history of southern New Zealand.

The Turnbull Thomson Falls are a cataract in the upper reaches of the Kitchener River, within Mount Aspiring National Park.

Thomson is the namesake of Mount Thomson in the Southern Alps.

== Sources ==
- Victor R Savage, Brenda S A Yeoh (2003), Toponymics – A Study of Singapore Street Names, Eastern Universities Press, ISBN 981-210-205-1
