= Horsburgh Lighthouse =

Lighthouse in Singapore

Horsburgh Lighthouse Pulau Batu Puteh Pedra Blanca
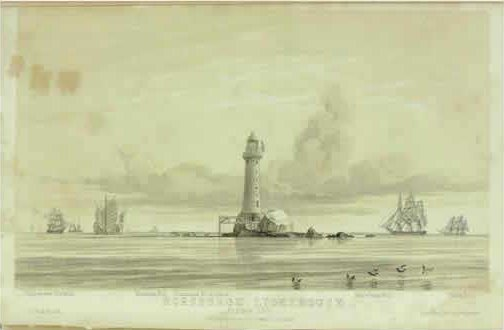
- Horsburgh Lighthouse by John Turnbull Thomson, who designed the lighthouse, showing the island of Pedra Branca just after the completion of the lighthouse in 1851
- Location: Pedra Branca, Singapore
- Coordinates: 1°19′49″N 104°24′20″E

Tower
- Constructed: 1851
- Construction: granite tower
- Height: 34 metres (112 ft)
- Shape: tapered cylindrical tower with balcony and lantern
- Markings: tower with black and white bands

Light
- Focal height: 31 metres (102 ft)
- Characteristic: Fl W 10s.

Horsburgh Lighthouse (Chinese: 霍士堡灯塔; Malay: Rumah Api Horsburgh; Tamil: ஹோர்ஸ்பர் கலங்கரை விளக்கம்) is an active lighthouse which marks the eastern entrance to the Straits of Singapore. It is situated on the island of Pedra Branca. Singapore's earliest lighthouse by date of completion, it is located approximately 54 kilometres (34 mi) to the east of Singapore and 14 kilometres (8.7 mi) from the Malaysian state of Johor.

== History ==
Horsburgh Lighthouse was named after Captain James Horsburgh (28 September 1762 – 14 May 1836), a Scottish hydrographer from the East India Company, who mapped many seaways around Singapore in the late 18th and early 19th century. He was called "the Nautical Oracle of the World". His charts and books allowed ships to navigate through treacherous areas of the ocean, saving many lives and property on the seas between China and India. On the wall of the Visitor's Room on the sixth floor of the lighthouse under the light room there is a panel with the following inscription:

Pharos Ego
Cui nomen praebuit
Horsburgh Hydrographus
In maribus Indo Sinicis praeter omnes praeclarus
Angliae Mercatorum nisi imprimis indole
Ex imperii opibus Anglo Indici denique constructa
Saluti nautarum insignis viri memoriae
Consule
A. D. MDCCCLI
W. J. Butterworth, C. B.,
Prov: Malacc. Praef.

A.D. 1851
The Horsburgh Lighthouse
is raised by the British enterprise of British Merchants,
and by the liberal aid of the East India Company,
to lessen the dangers of navigation,
and likewise to hand down,
so long as it shall last,
in the scene of his useful labours,
The Memory of the Great Hydrographer
whose name it bears.
Col. W. J. Butterworth, C. B.,
Governor in the Straits of Malacca.
J. T. Thomson,
Architect.

Translated literally into English, the Latin inscription reads:

I, the lighthouse, to whom was given the name of Horsburgh the Hydrographer who is famous beyond all others in the Indo-Chinese sea, was constructed, if not primarily by the natural talents of the English merchants, then certainly by the power of the Anglo-Indian empire, for the salvation of sailors and in memory of the famous man, during the consulate of W. J. Butterworth, C. B., governor of the province of Malacca, in 1851.

== Location ==
The lighthouse was built over an outcrop of rocks that for centuries was identified on maps as Pedra Branca ("white rock" in Portuguese). It was built by John Turnbull Thomson (1821–1884), a government surveyor. In the presence of Governor William John Butterworth and other dignitaries, the lighthouse foundation stone was laid on 24 May 1850 and the lighthouse was completed in 1851. The lighthouse is also known as Pedra Branca Lighthouse.

The sovereignty of Pedra Branca was disputed between Malaysia and Singapore until 2008. On 23 May 2008, the International Court of Justice awarded the island to Singapore.

== See also ==
- List of lighthouses in Singapore
