= Sultan Shoal Lighthouse =

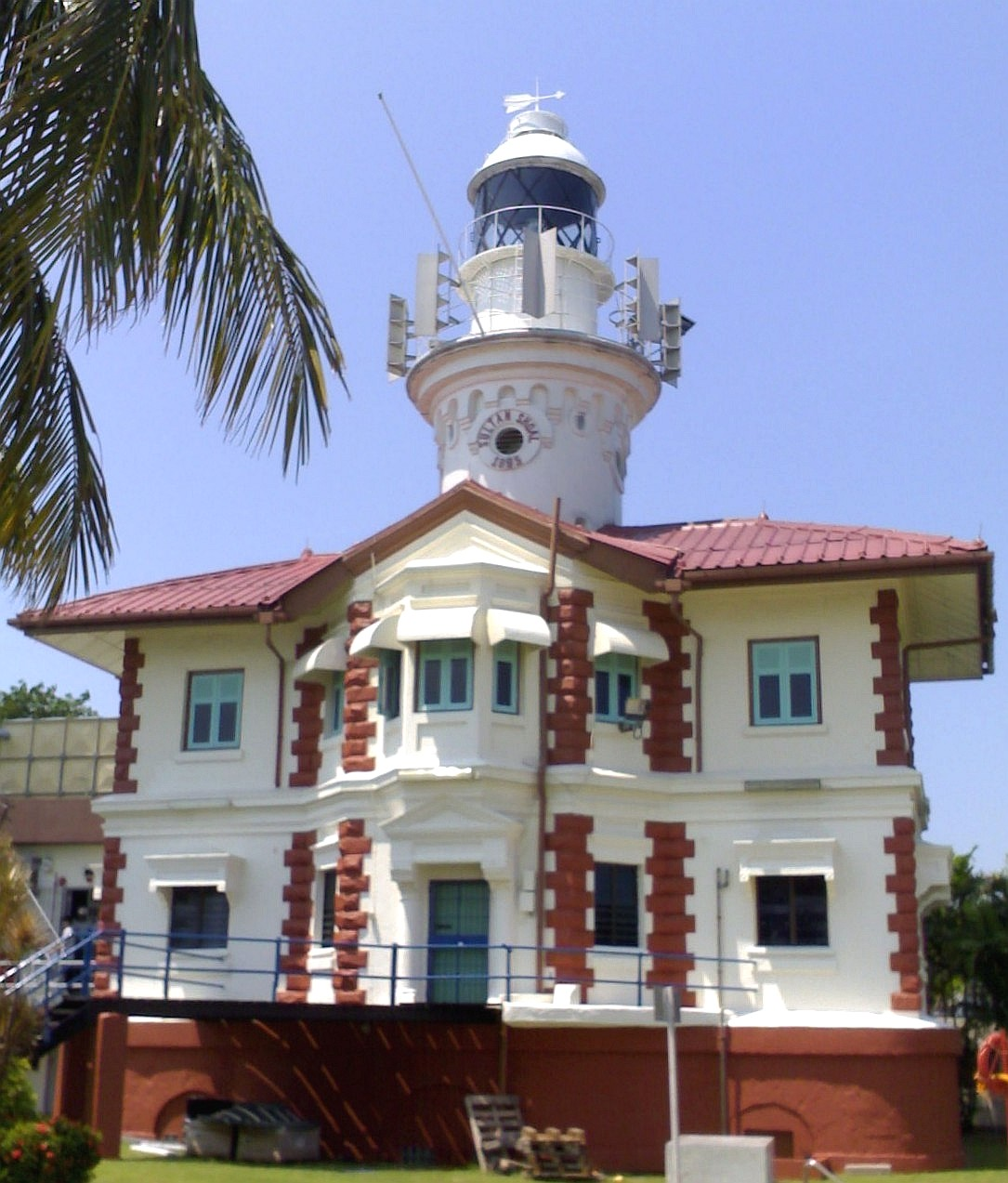
- Location: Singapore
- Coordinates: 1°14′24″N 103°38′53″E

Tower
- Constructed: 1895
- Construction: rubble masonry (tower)
- Height: 18 m (59 ft)
- Shape: Cylindrical tower with balcony and lantern on a two-story dwelling.
- Markings: White

Light
- Range: 20 nmi (37 km; 23 mi)
- Characteristic: Fl(2) W 15s

The Sultan Shoal Lighthouse (Chinese: 苏丹浅滩灯塔; Malay: Rumah Api Sultan Shoal; Tamil: சுல்தான் ஷோல் கலங்கரை விளக்கம்) was built in 1895 during the time when the late Commander Charles Quentin Gregan Craufurd (from the Royal Navy) was the Master Attendant (equivalent to the present day Port Master) of Singapore. It was built to replace the beacon previously established there.

== History ==
In 1875, a granite beacon on Sultan Shoal was struck by lightning. The Master-Attendant from the government suggested that whilst the beacon was under repair, a lookout house should be built for ships arriving from the west. He also noted that many masters and agents of ships complained over a delay to build a pilot station, estimated to cost $1,000. Both ideas were approved by the Government to the Chamber of Commerce. When it was submitted to the Colonial Engineer, it was found that it would be impractical to build it on a shoal. The Colonial Engineer suggested that a screwpile structure be built, along with providing dwelling for the pilots and installing a fixed light.

The lighthouse tower was rebuilt in 1931 for installation of modern lighting equipment.

In 1984, the lighthouse was automated at a cost of S$500,000 and currently unmanned.

In 1992, LED navigational lanterns replaced the system.

A radar beacon was added to the lighthouse.

There are two holiday chalets on the island which were unused since 2012.

In 2014, Sultan Shoal Lighthouse was part of a lighthouse trail walk, consisting of three lighthouses, organised by the National Heritage Board as part of Singapore's HeritageFest. It was the first time the lighthouse was opened for public access.

DHI Water & Environment Singapore was hired by the Maritime and Port Authority of Singapore (MPA) to relocate 2,300 coral colonies from Sultan Shoal to the Sisters' Islands and Saint John's Island.

== Operations ==
Three single-wick lamps fitted with parabolic reflectors were used. Incandescent oil dioptric light with ‘Hood’ burner was used in 1931 with a 3rd Order 500 mm optic. (The Order is a system of classifying the type of lenses used based on the focal length of the lens). This optic revolved on mercury, producing an intensity of 670,000 candelas with a visibility range of 22 nautical miles (about 40 km). This kerosene burning lighting equipment was replaced in 1967 by an electrically operated 100-volt/1,000-watt light source. A generator room was built on the east side of the lighthouse to house three generators. With the generators, the seven-men lighthouse crew was reduced to four.

The 3rd Order optic was replaced by a rotating beacon, which possessed a revolving array of 24 lamps-cum-reflectors. An ‘S’ and ‘X’ band radar beacon was also installed in 1984 which provides additional navigational information to ships by emitting a morse code on the ship's radar screen.

Operated by the MPA, the present lighthouse equipment consists of a main and standby rotating beacon, each producing 110,000 candelas with a range of 20 nautical miles (about 37 km).

== See also ==
- List of lighthouses in Singapore

== Gallery ==
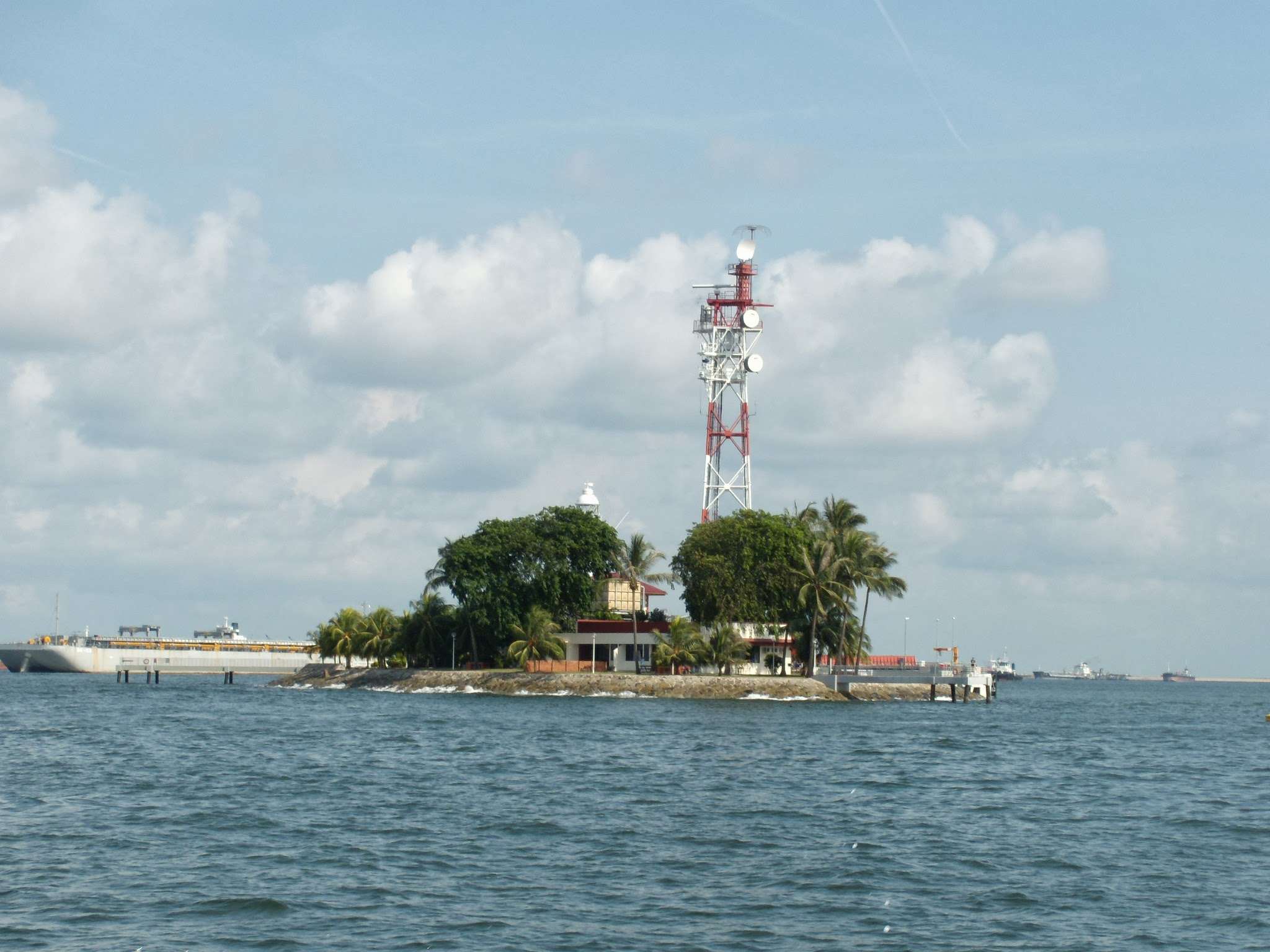
Sultan Shoal from nearby

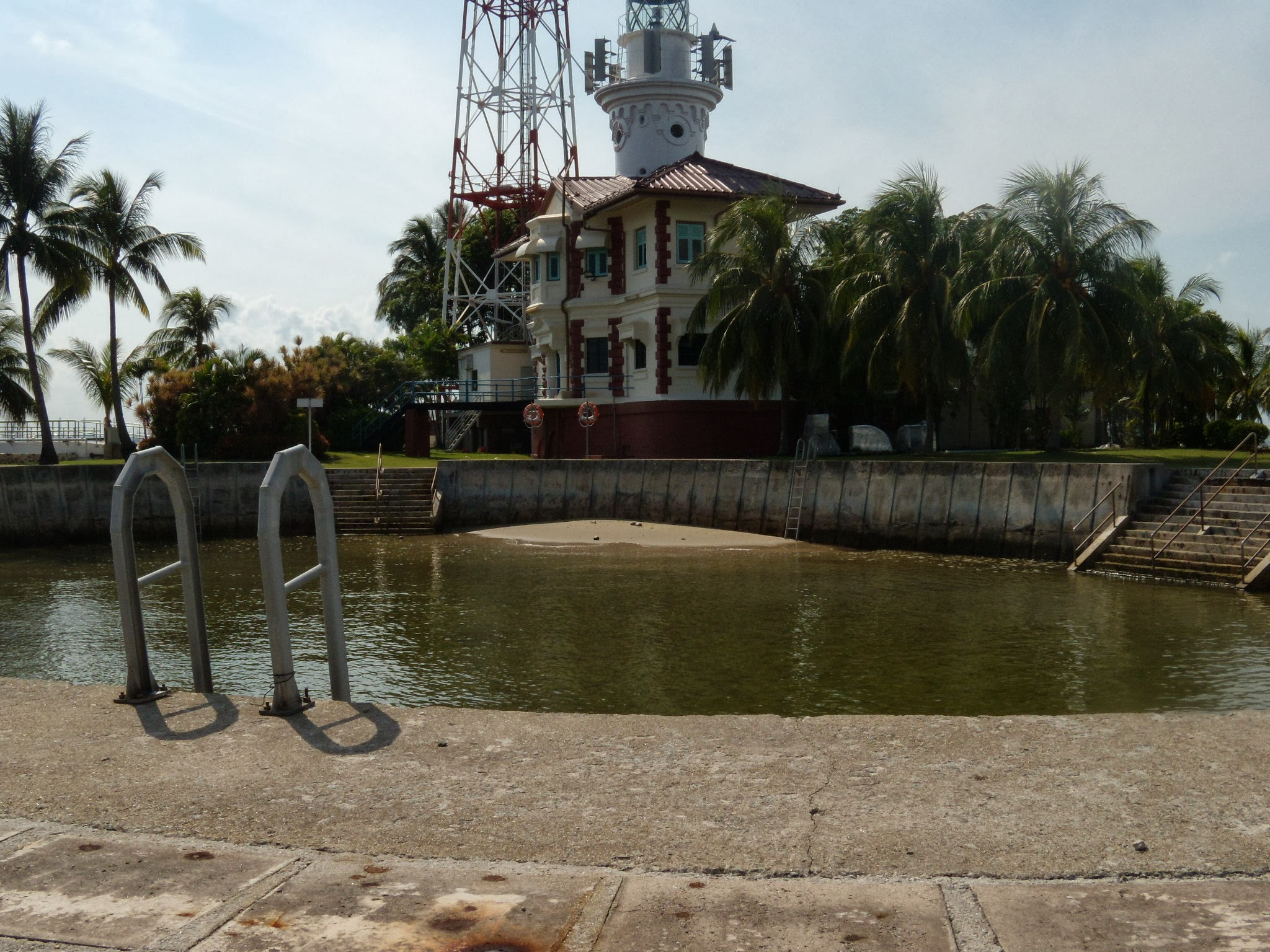
Lagoon inside Sultan Shoal

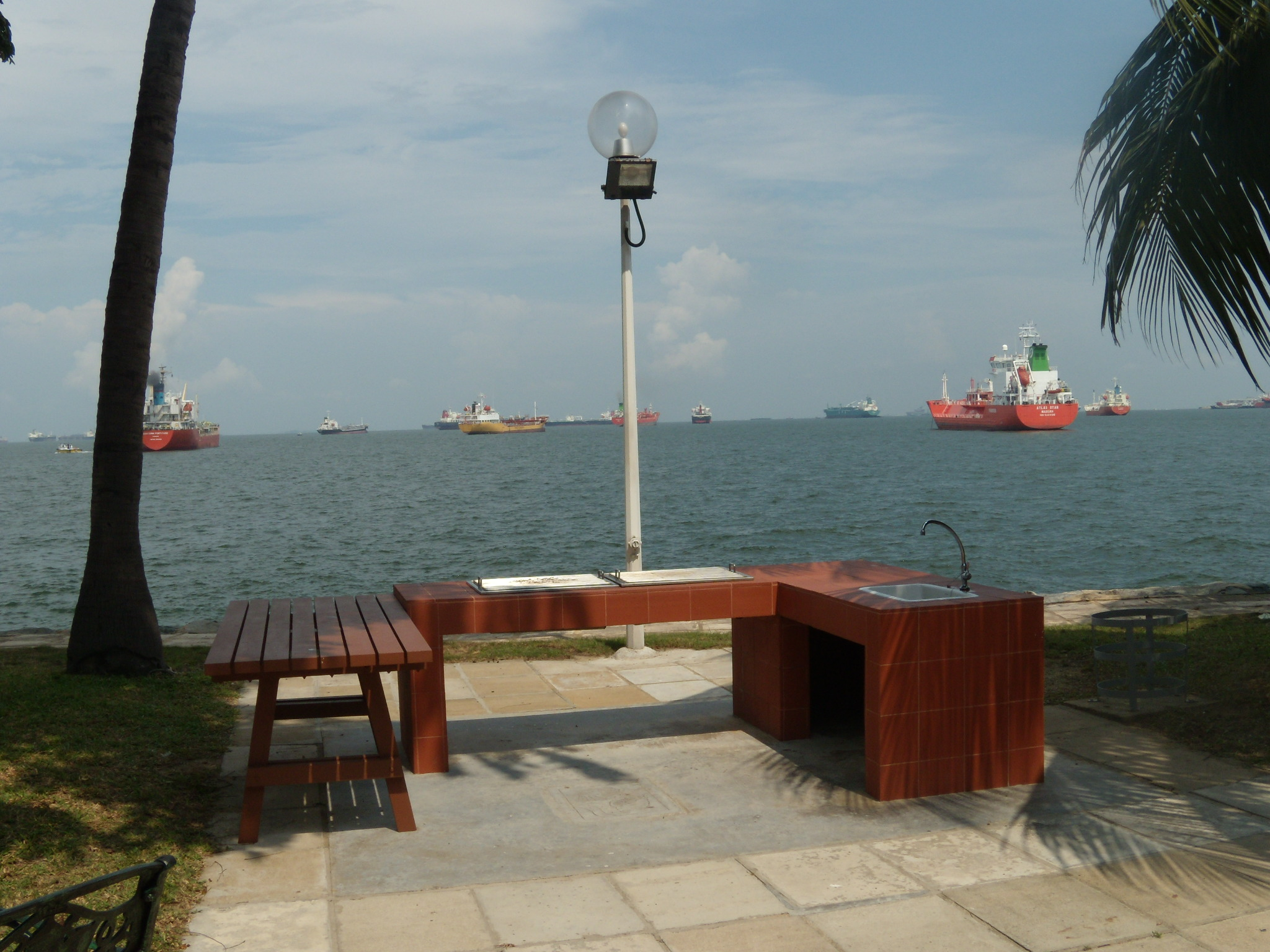
Barbeque station at Sultan Shoal
