= Maritime and Port Authority of Singapore =

Statuary board of the government of Singapore

Agency overview
- Formed: 2 February 1996; 30 years ago
- Preceding agencies: Marine Department; National Maritime Board; Regulatory department of Port of Singapore Authority
- Jurisdiction: Government of Singapore
- Headquarters: 460 Alexandra Road, mTower, #18-00, Singapore 119963
- Agency executives: Loh Khum Yean, Chairman; Ang Wee Keong, Chief Executive
- Parent agency: Ministry of Transport
- Website: mpa.gov.sg
- Agency ID: T08GB0029G

The Maritime and Port Authority of Singapore (MPA) is a statutory board under the Ministry of Transport of the Government of Singapore.

== History ==
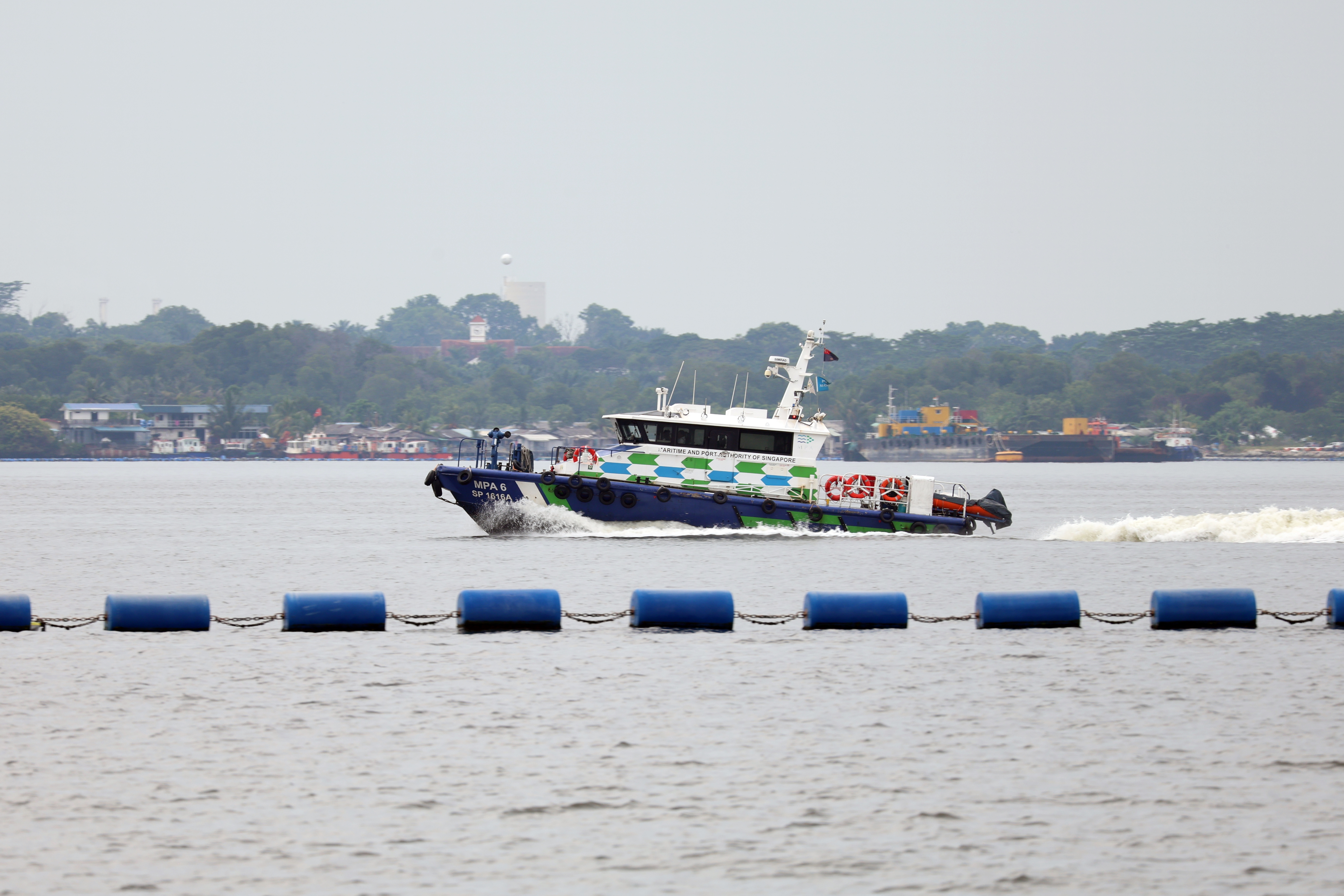
MPA harbour launch in the Johor Strait near Pulau Ubin

The Maritime and Port Authority of Singapore (MPA) was established on 2 February 1996 by the MPA Act of 1996 through the merger of the Marine Department (which was under the then Ministry of Communications), National Maritime Board and the Regulatory departments of the former Port of Singapore Authority (PSA). PSA was subsequently corporatised on 1 October 1997 and became known as PSA Corporation. In 2004, to further streamline all maritime-related functions, the industry promotion function for shipping was transferred from IE Singapore to MPA.

== Role ==
As port authority, the MPA regulates and manages port and marine services, facilities and activities within Singaporean waters. This includes vessel traffic and navigational safety and security, through regulation on operational efficiency and on the environment.

As developer and promoter, MPA works with other government agencies and maritime industry partners to make Singapore a leading global hub port and a top international maritime centre. Its aims include attracting a core group of shipowners and operators to establish operations in Singapore, broadening the breadth and depth of maritime ancillary services offered, and improving the business environment for the maritime industry.

As the National Sea Transport Representative, the MPA safeguards Singapore's maritime/port interests in the international arena. This extends to being the government's advisor on matters relating to sea transport, and maritime/port services and facilities.

== Singapore registry of ships ==
The Singapore Registry of Ships (SRS) was established in 1966. Today, Singapore is reputed for its quality ship registry and is ranked among the world's top ten largest ship registries, with a fleet of more than 4,400 ships and tonnage of 96 million gross tons. SRS has also one of the youngest fleets among the top ten registries, with an average age of ten years.

The MPA claims that the steady growth of the SRS attests to the effective administration and "quality flag" strategy that the MPA develops and promotes since its establishment. The SRS has grown steadily by about 8 per cent, from 18 million GT in 1996 to 43.7 million GT in 2008.

== Initiatives ==
=== Tuas Port ===
MPA is constructing a high-tech port in Tuas, Singapore, where PSA Singapore will be the sole operator. It is expected to be fully operational by 2040 and handle 65 million twenty-foot cargo units a year.

=== International Maritime Centre ===
The International Maritime Centre (IMC) 2030 Advisory Committee, which comprises 22 business leaders and experts, was set up by MPA to chart the direction of Singapore as a maritime hub.

=== Artificial Intelligence ===
MPA is partnering with Fujitsu to test the Fujitsu Human Centric AI Zinrai system, which detects ship collision risks and predicts risk hotspots through artificial intelligence. This aimed to warn ships about potential collisions.
