= Battle box =

Battle box can refer to:

- The Battle Box, a command centre in Singapore used in World War II's Malayan Campaign
- Battle box, a term used in some collectible card games for a set of cards intended to help new players get started; essentially a larger booster pack
- Battle Box, a Minecraft minigame played in MC Championship
