= Thomas Oxley =

Thomas Oxley may refer to:

- Thomas Oxley (British surgeon) (1805–1886), surgeon of the Straits Settlements
- Thomas Oxley (neurologist) (born 1980), neurologist and executive at Synchron
