= Pavilion, Singapore =

Pavilion
- Location within Singapore

General information
- Status: Private
- Architectural style: Colonial mansion
- Location: Singapore, 5 Oxley Rise, Singapore
- Coordinates: 1.297676°N 103.841775°E
- Owner: Thomas Oxley; Friedrich Albert Schreiber; Catchick Moses; Manasseh Meyer; Cheong Eak Chong

The Pavilion is a house located at 5 Oxley Rise, Oxley Hill, near Orchard Road in Singapore. The Pavilion served as Government House between 1859 and 1861, after Raffles House was demolished to make way for a fort.

== History ==
=== Oxley Estate ===
The Pavilion was built around 1847 at Thomas Oxley's, Surgeon of the Straits Settlements, nutmeg estate. It was one of five houses Oxley built at a hill that came to be called Oxley's Hill - Pavilion, Bargany House, Bargany Lodge, Killiney House and Killiney Bungalow. Another version has it that it was built by George Garden Nicol. The Pavilion was one of two houses in his estate that Oxley used as his residence. The other was Killiney House. The Pavilion was sited at the top of Oxley's Hill.

=== Government House (1859-1861) ===
In 1856, the house was sold to Friedrich Albert Schreiber. Schreiber was a partner in the German trading firm of Behn, Meyer and Co.

In 1859, the governor's residence at Raffles House on Government Hill was demolished to make way for a fort. Government House was temporarily moved to the Pavilion. At the time, Schreiber, the owner of the Pavilion, was away in Europe.

The lease for the Pavilion expired in 1861 and Government House was moved to new leased premises at Leonie Hill and Leonie Cottage.

=== Later years ===
Prominent Armenian businessman Catchick Moses bought the Pavilion in 1874 and made it his residence. Moses is remembered for having started the Straits Times. Moses was well respected, and local residents used to go to him at the Pavilion for advice and to settle differences.

After Moses' death in 1892, his family continued to occupy the Pavilion until it was sold by public auction in 1918 to Manasseh Meyer for Straits $147,000. The Pavilion was then converted into a private residential hotel.

In the 1920s - 1930s, the property was leased to Ishihara Sangyo Koshi (ISK). ISK was a major Japanese mining concern operating iron mines in Malaya. Yoshio Nishimura, managing director of ISK and president of the Japanese Association, resided at the property till his death in December 1934.
