= Fort Canning Lighthouse =

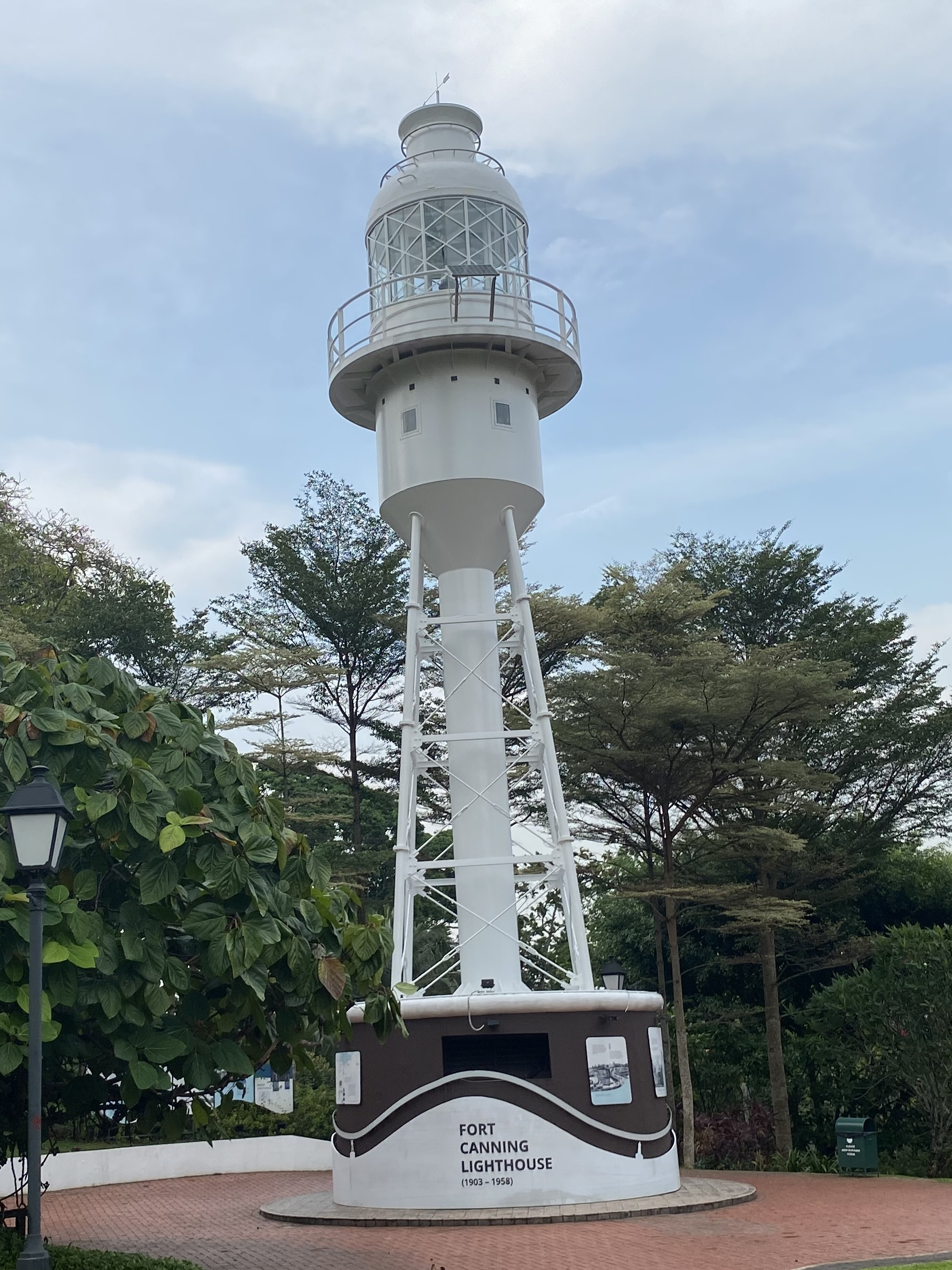
- Fort Canning Lighthouse in 2023
- Location: Fort Canning Hill, Singapore
- Coordinates: 01°17′31.88″N 103°50′52.36″E

Tower
- Constructed: 1855 (first)
- Foundation: 1-story basement
- Construction: skeletal tower
- Height: 24.3 metres (80 ft)
- Shape: square pyramidal with balcony and lantern
- Markings: white tower and lantern

Light
- First lit: 1903 (current)
- Deactivated: 1958
- Focal height: 36.3 metres (119 ft)
- Lens: dioptric occulting 3 in 17 seconds
- Intensity: white and red 20,000 cd
- Range: 18 nautical miles (33 km; 21 mi)
- Characteristic: decoration light

Fort Canning Lighthouse, also known as Fort Canning Light, is a lighthouse located on top of Fort Canning Hill, Singapore, and was formerly one of the 13 important lighthouses in the Straits of Malacca. Located nearby with The Flagstaff and the Time Ball, the three navigation structures played an essential role during the early maritime history of Singapore.

== History ==
Fort Canning Hill, with its strategic location overlooking the Singapore Harbour, was used as a communication centre after the British established port here in 1819. The first communication facility built on the hill was a flagstaff. The flagstaff was used to display the arrival, identity, location and status of ships entering Singapore Harbour. This was followed by a time ball, a lighthouse and a telegraph office in later years.

=== Construction ===
Fort Canning Lighthouse was built on the southern side of Fort Canning Hill to guide ships safely towards the Singapore Harbour. The first signal light on Fort Canning was a simple lantern attached to the top of the Flagstaff in 1855. The Flagstaff light was replaced by the Lighthouse in 1903 by Riley, Hargreaves & Co., who in 1909 combined with another company to form United Engineers that is still present to this day at nearby River Valley.

The light was created by a burner fuelled by kerosene, which generated 20,000 candlepower and itself was dioptric occulting type. The light was "eclipsed" (darkened) every 17 seconds by lowering a metal cylinder around the burner for 3 seconds, thus giving rise to the term "occulting type". Though the Lighthouse survived the destruction of the Second World War, it was finally closed and dismantled in December 1958, when new tall buildings were making it invisible from the sea. It was replaced by a new signal light using electricity that was erected on top of the Fullerton Building. The Fullerton Light was itself taken down in 1979 and is now in the Maritime Museum of Singapore.

=== The Lighthouse today ===
Due to its historic significance, a replica of the Lighthouse was later erected near its original site by the government of Singapore. Though its lights are fully functional, it no longer serves its original purpose but stands today as a legacy of its contribution to Singapore maritime history.

== Gallery ==
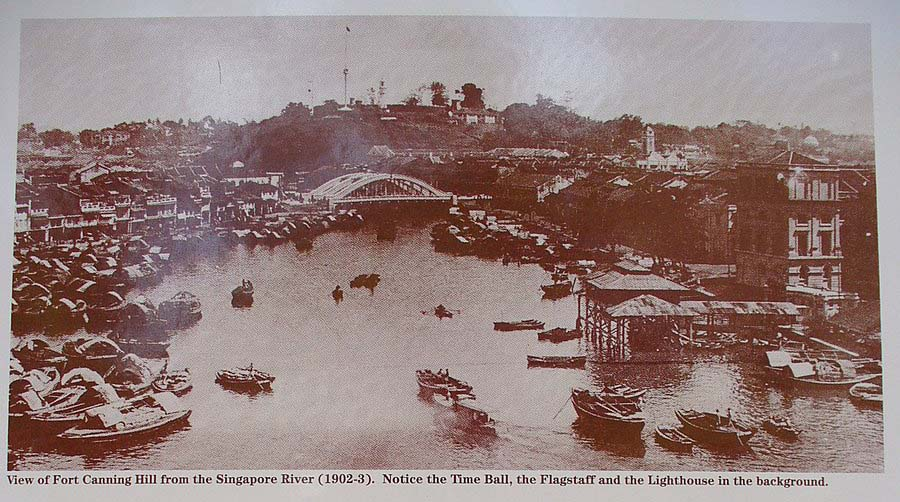
In the background shows the original lighthouse (left), together with the Flagstaff and the Time Ball on Fort Canning Hill, circa 1902

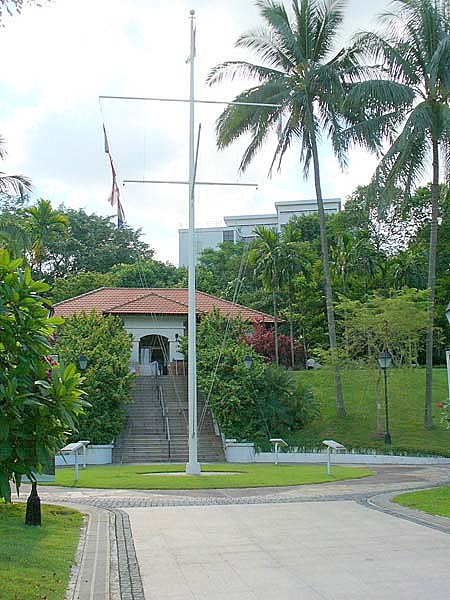
The Flagstaff, one of the three early navigation structures on Fort Canning Hill

== See also ==
- List of lighthouses in Singapore
