= Fort Canning Hill =

Park in Singapore

- River Valley Road Entrance to Fort Canning Park on Fort Canning Hill

Highest point
- Elevation: 156 feet (48 m)
- Coordinates: 1°17′40″N 103°50′49″E

Naming
- Native name: Bukit Larangan (Malay); 福康宁山 (Chinese); ஃபோர்ட் கேனிங் குன்று (Tamil)

Geography
- Location within Singapore
- Location: Museum, Singapore
- Parent range: 18 hectares (180,000 m^{2})

Geology
- Mountain type: hill

Fort Canning Hill, (Note: Formerly Government Hill, Singapore Hill, and Bukit Larangan (Forbidden Hill in Malay)) or simply known as Fort Canning, is a prominent hill, about 48 metres (157 ft) high, in the southeast portion of Singapore, within the Museum planning area of the Central Area that borders Singapore's central business district.

The hill has a long history intertwined with that of the country due to its location as the highest elevation within walking distance to the city's civic district, which sits within the adjacent Downtown Core. It is also a popular location for exhibitions, concerts, and outdoor recreation.

== Etymology ==
Fort Canning Hill was named after Viscount Charles John Canning, the first Viceroy of India. The Malays have called the hill Bukit Larangan or Forbidden Hill since olden times. This is due to the belief that it is the place where the kings of ancient Singapore were laid to rest, and it was believed to be haunted.

It is also believed that a palace once stood on the hill. A settlement on the hill in the 15th century was referred to as Ban Zu (from the Malay pancur) by the Yuan dynasty traveller Wang Dayuan. Later, Sir Stamford Raffles built his residence there, which was also used by other Residents and Governors. It became known as Government Hill until it was renamed Fort Canning in 1861, when a military fort was built on the site. Today it is the location of both the Fort Canning Reservoir and Fort Canning Park.

== History ==
=== Temasek / Ban Zu ===
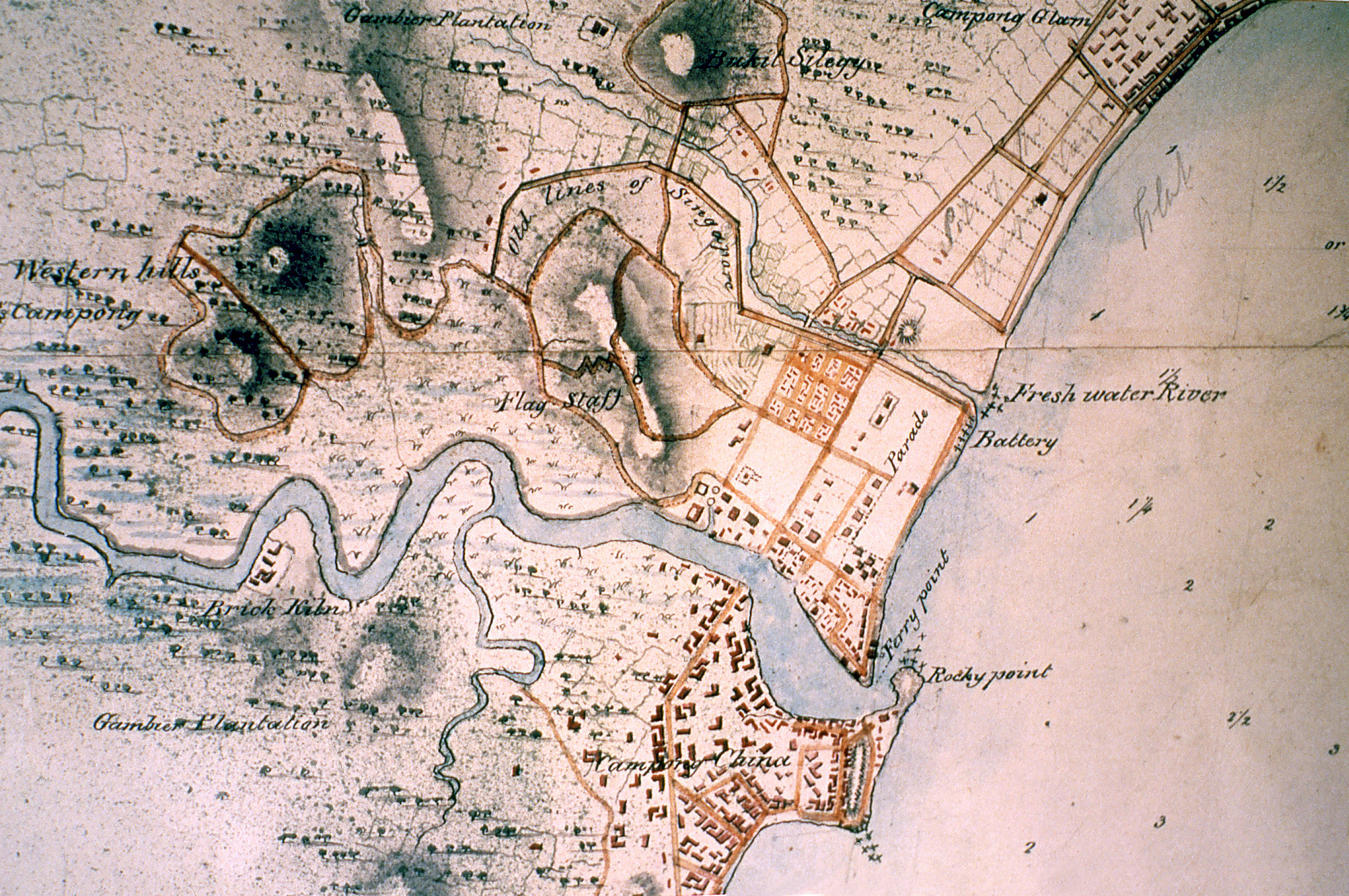
1825 map of Singapore. The Fort Canning Hill area was bounded on its north by ruins of an old wall marked as Old Lines of Singapore and to the south by Singapore River

It is believed that the Fort Canning Hill area was once the centre of ancient Singapura that thrived in the 15th century, and was occupied by a palace with various buildings of political, religious and commercial significance. In around 1330, the Chinese traveller Wang Dayuan visited the island of Singapore he named as Danmaxi (Temasek). Wang described in his work Daoyi Zhilüe the two distinct settlements of Temasek: Long Ya Men and Ban Zu. Ban Zu, located on a hill behind Long Ya Men, is thought to be today's Fort Canning Hill. In contrast to the inhabitants of Long Ya Men who were described as being prone to acts of piracy, the people of Ban Zu were described as honest. The people were said to "wear their hair short, with a turban of gold-brocaded satin", and they also wore red-coloured clothes and had a leader. Evidence of the significance of Fort Canning Hill had been found; in 1928, a cache of gold ornaments dating to the mid-14th century was discovered while workers were excavating for the Fort Canning Reservoir. A series of archaeological digs that began in 1984 have uncovered evidence of workshops for glass and gold that dated to the 15th century, and a ceremonial or religious area near the summit.

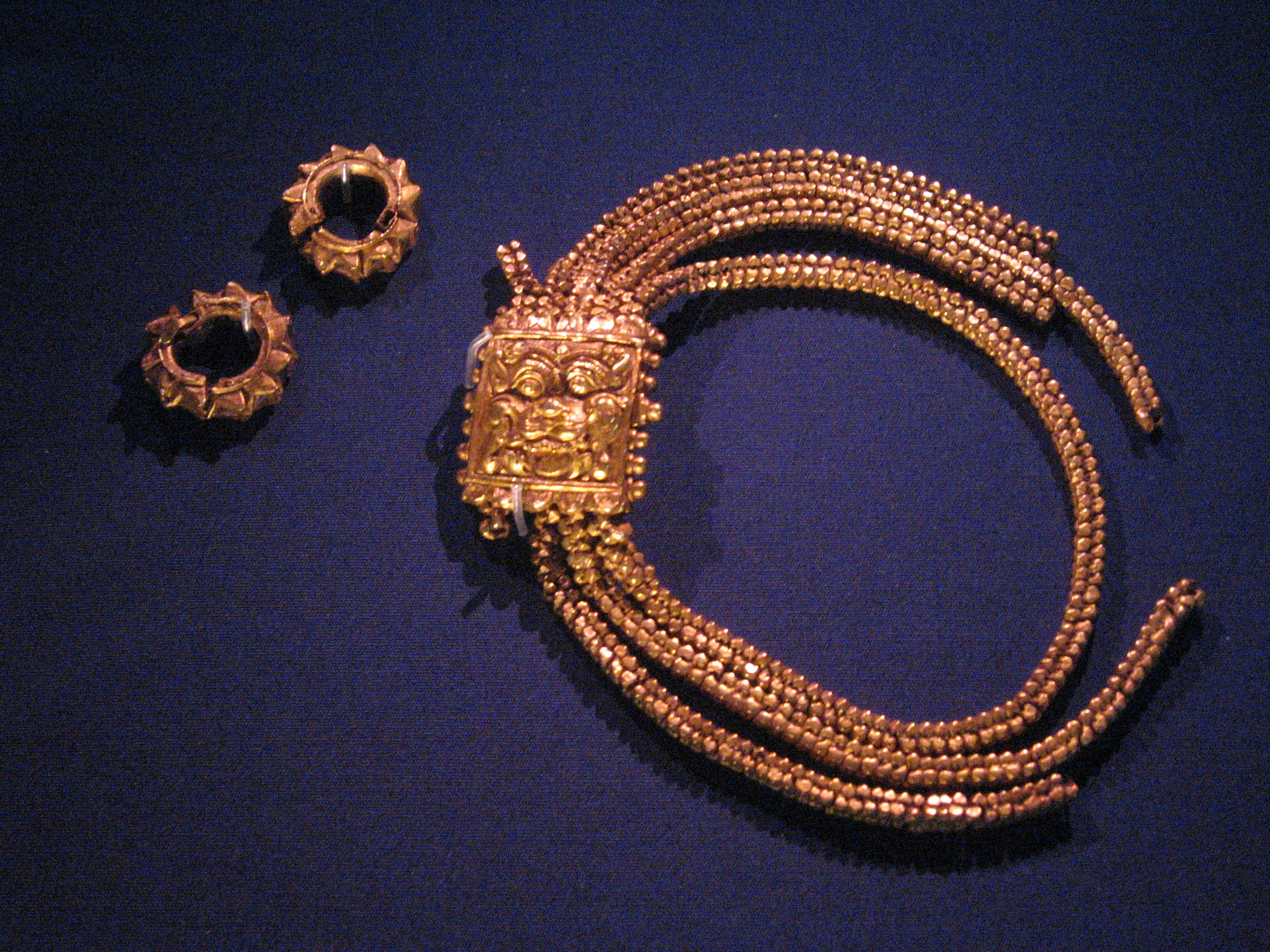
Jewellery found at Fort Canning Hill dating to the mid-15th century

Historical sources also indicate that around the end of the 15th century, Singapura was attacked by either the Majapahit or the Siamese, forcing its ruler Parameswara to move on to Melaka where he founded the Sultanate of Malacca. Archaeological evidence suggests that the settlement on Fort Canning was abandoned around this time, although a small trading settlement continued in Singapore for some time afterwards. Ruins of the settlement on Fort Canning Hill were still visible in the early 19th century and described by the Resident John Crawfurd who also found indication of ruins of an ancient orchard, shards of pottery and Chinese coins, the earliest of which dating to 10th century Song dynasty. Crawfurd described the ruins of a square terrace of 40 feet (12 m) square that may have been a temple near the top of the hill, with another terrace almost as big on the northern slope of the hill said to the tombs of a Malay king, Iskandar Shah, although there is no evidence of a burial there.

Ban Zu is likely a transcription of the Malay word pancur meaning a spring or stream. Spring used to exist on the west side of the hill, called pancur larangan or "forbidden spring", where the women of the ruler's household were said to bathe in ancient times. In the early period of 19th century Singapore, the stream was used to provide clean drinking water for all ships stopping at the port until the demand exceeded the capacity, and the spring dried up as wells were dug around the hill.

=== Early colonial period ===
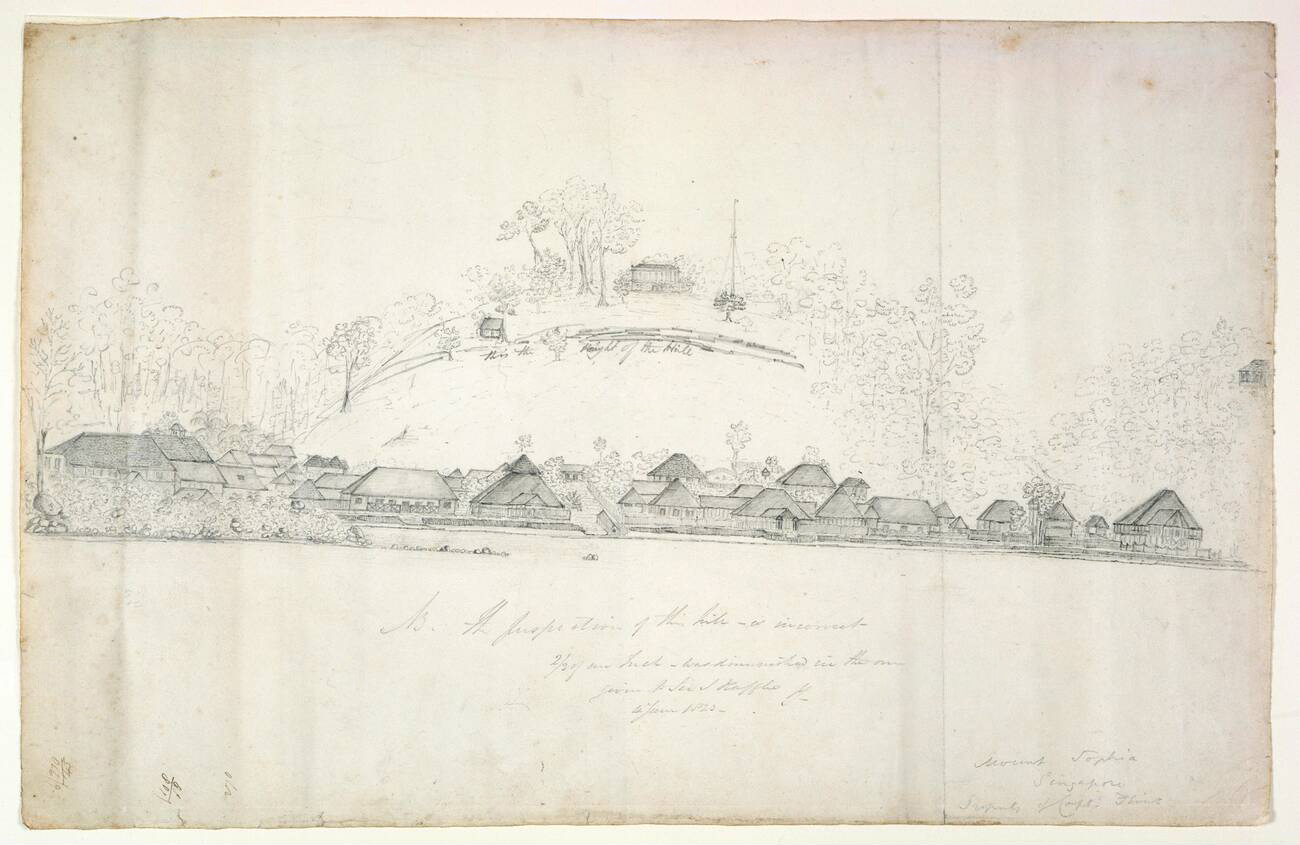
Early drawing of the town of Singapore from 1823, with Fort Canning Hill in the background, known simply as "The Hill" in the early years.

On 6 February 1819, Temenggong Abdul Rahman and Sultan Hussein Shah signed The Singapore Treaty with Stamford Raffles. Major William Farquhar, accompanied by a few Malaccan Malays, climbed up the Bukit Larangan. Farquhar drew up the first gun and set up the post to hoist the Union Jack on top of the hill, marking the birth of Singapore as a British settlement. Raffles appointed Farquhar as the first Resident and Commandant of Singapore on the same day. Before leaving on the next day, Raffles left Farquhar with a set of instructions on the administration of the new British settlement. The hill was later known as the Singapore Hill.

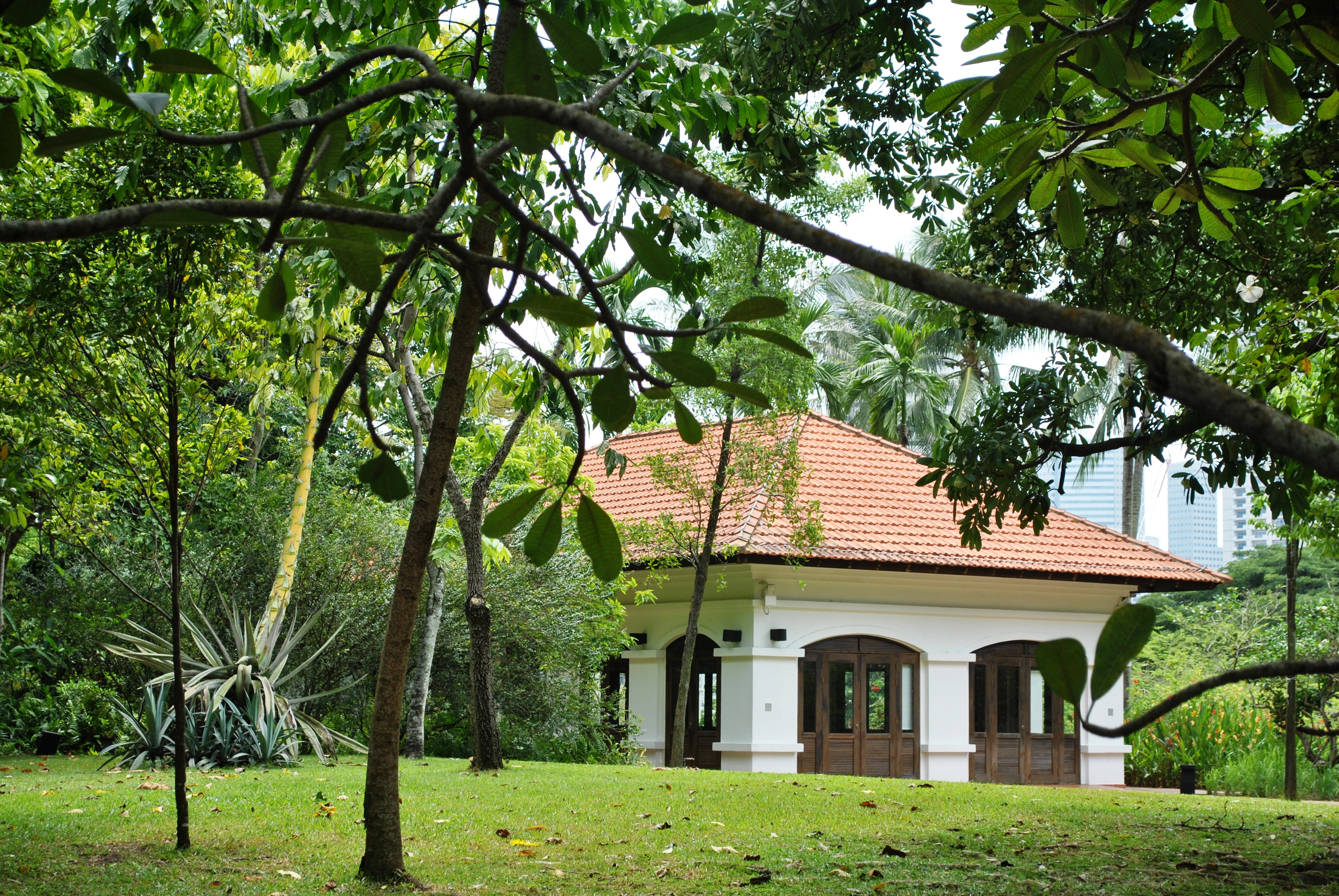
Raffles House, but not the original built by Raffles, which was a wood and atap structure.

While Raffles was still in Bencoolen, Sumatra at the time, George Drumgold Coleman, having waited for him to return for four months, in the meantime designed for Raffles the Residency House for his residence use. Upon his return in October 1822 and impressed with Coleman's design, Raffles approved the house, construction of which was soon begun on Singapore Hill in November 1822 and completed by January 1823. It was a wooden bungalow with an attap roof, and had a dimension of 100 ft. by 50 ft. It had two parallel halls with verandas at both the front and back, and two square wings serving as sleeping quarters.

Raffles also established Singapore's first botanical garden there in 1822. 48 acres of land were set aside for experimental crop cultivation, but the experiment failed and the garden was then abandoned in 1829.

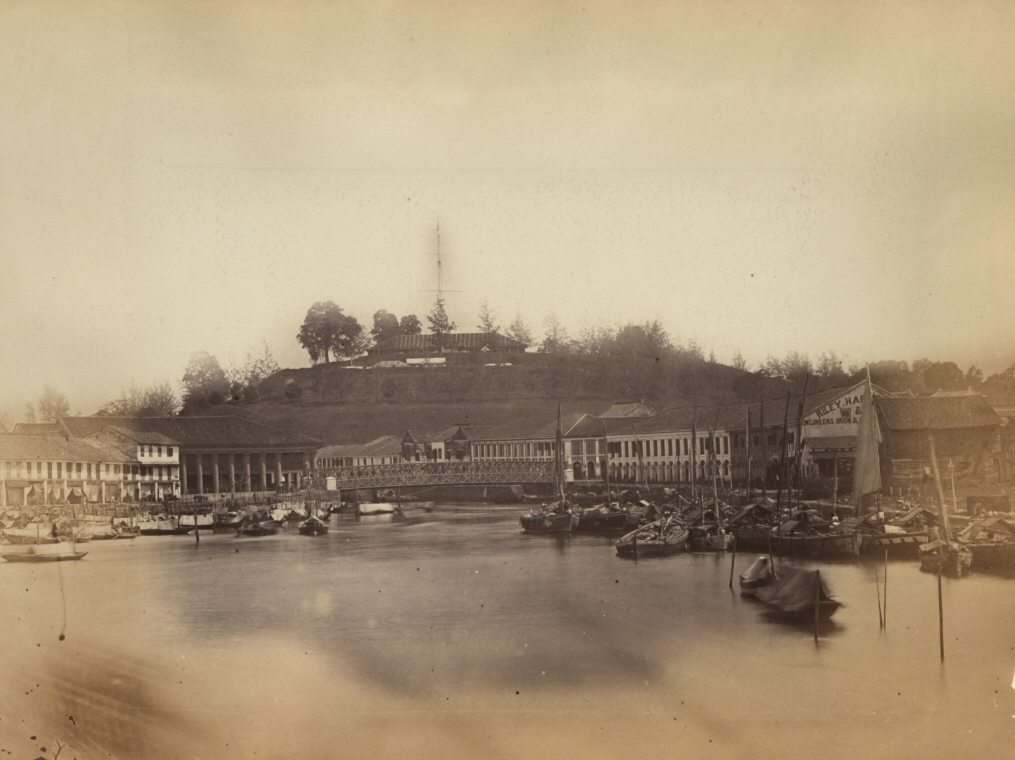
Fort Canning viewed from the Singapore River at the end of the 19th century

Raffles' former residence was extended and redesigned by Coleman with bricks and tiles in June 1824, as funded by the 2nd Resident John Crawfurd to be used by other Residents and Governors of Singapore as the Government House, thus the location gained the name Government Hill. When the residence was demolished in 1859 to make way for a fort, Government House was moved to a house in Oxley Estate called the Pavilion.

On 2 August 1824, Temenggong Abdul Rahman, Sultan Hussein, and John Crawfurd signed the Treaty of Friendship and Alliance at the hill. The hill was also known by the Malays as Bukit Bendera (Note: (Flag Hill in Malay)) after the Union Jack flag hoisted on the hill by William Farquhar, and later, also as Bukit Tuan Bonham (Note: (Sir Bonham’s Hill in Malay)) after Sir Samuel George Bonham, who was governor from 1836 to 1848.

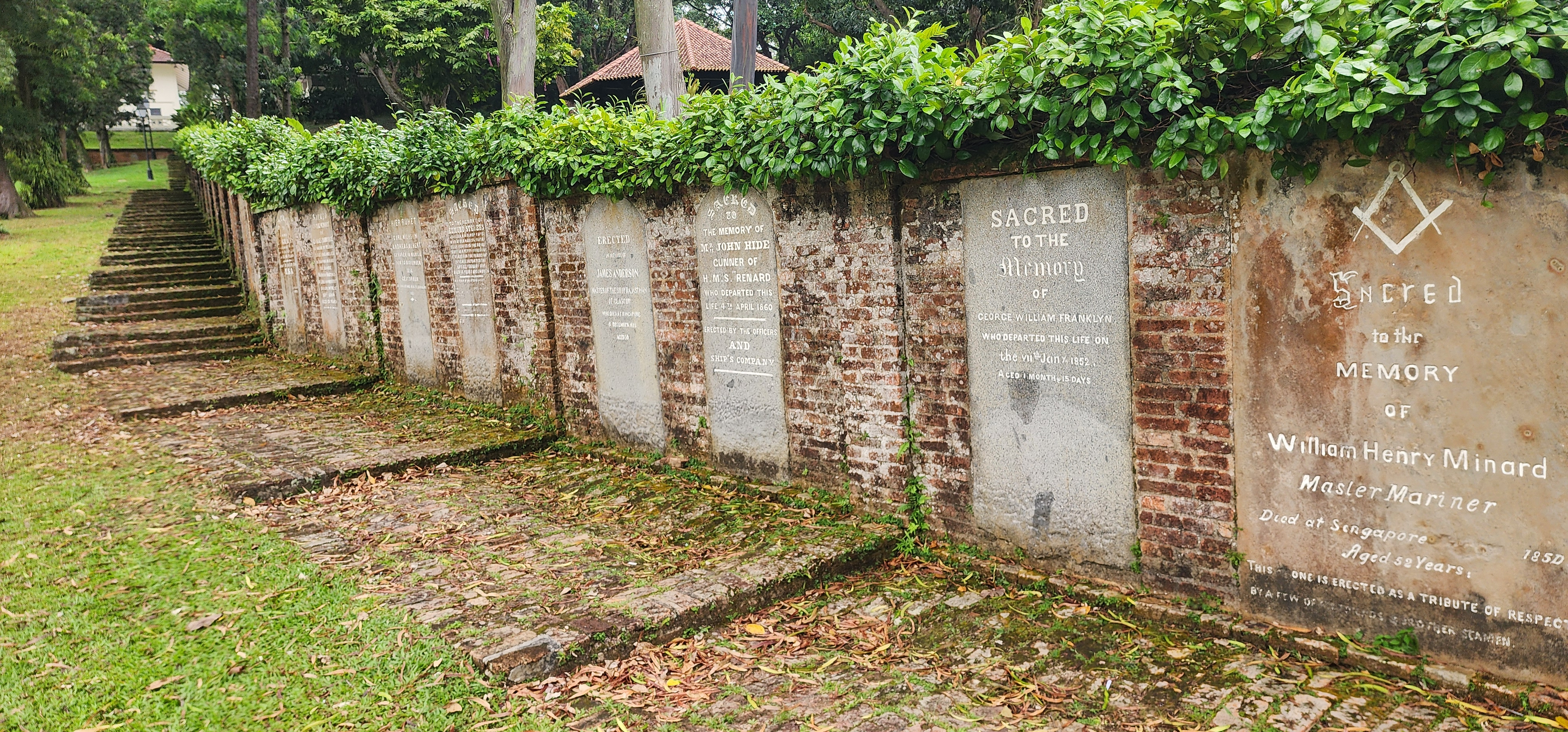
Remaining tombstones from the Old Christian Cemetery in Fort Canning Park.

A Christian cemetery used to exist on the hill, serving as the burial ground for early Europeans in Singapore. The first Christian cemetery was used until 1822 and had 3 burials, was located close to Raffles house. The second cemetery was located on the slopes of Fort Canning Hill, and was expanded and consecrated in 1834. A brick wall and a Gothic gateway were constructed in 1846 to enclose it, built by Captain Charles Edward Faber. Two classical monuments, and some headstones placed along brick walls remained at the site. The cemetery continued to be used until 1865 when it was declared full and closed. By this time, around one third of the burials there were of Chinese Christians. In the 1970s the cemetery was exhumed and many of the surviving tombstones were embedded in the surviving walls.

=== Fortification and military use ===
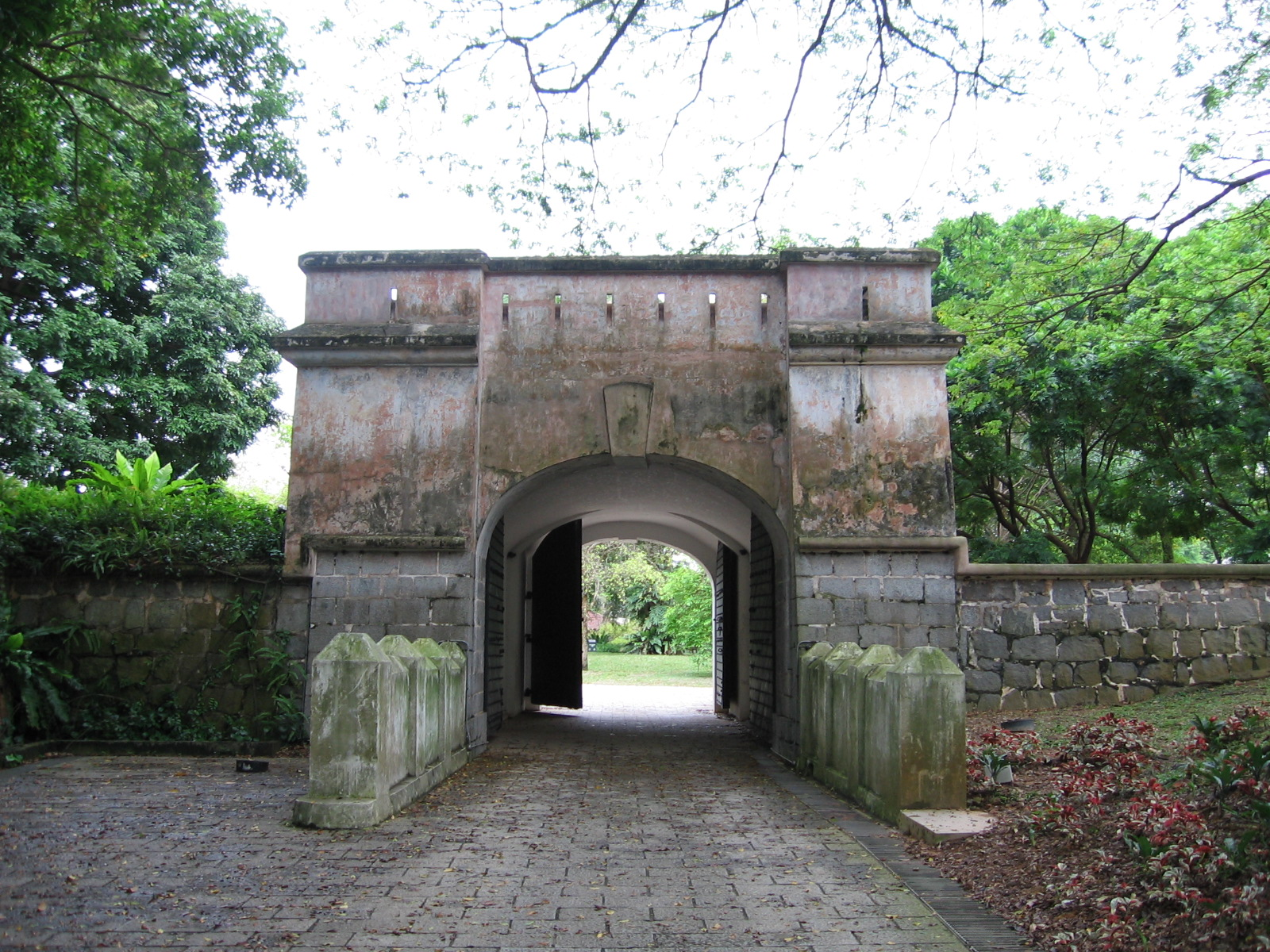
The Gate of Fort Canning

By 1859, the absence of harbour defence led to the hill being used for a military role. The governor's residence was demolished, and a fort with an arms store, barracks and a hospital was built. The fort was completed in 1861, and was named Fort Canning after Viscount Charles John Canning, who was then Governor-General and the first Viceroy of India. A report recommended extensive fortifications, which alarmed the business community who felt a large fortress would be detrimental to trade. Eventually officer's quarters and a series of platforms carrying seven 68-pounders were built facing the sea. In 1867 eight 8-inch shell guns and two 13-inch shell guns were added. However, the fortifications were considered a failure from the beginning, as ships could easily get close enough to destroy the town yet remain out of range of the fort's guns. Moreover, the lack of a water supply rendered the fort useless as a place of refuge.

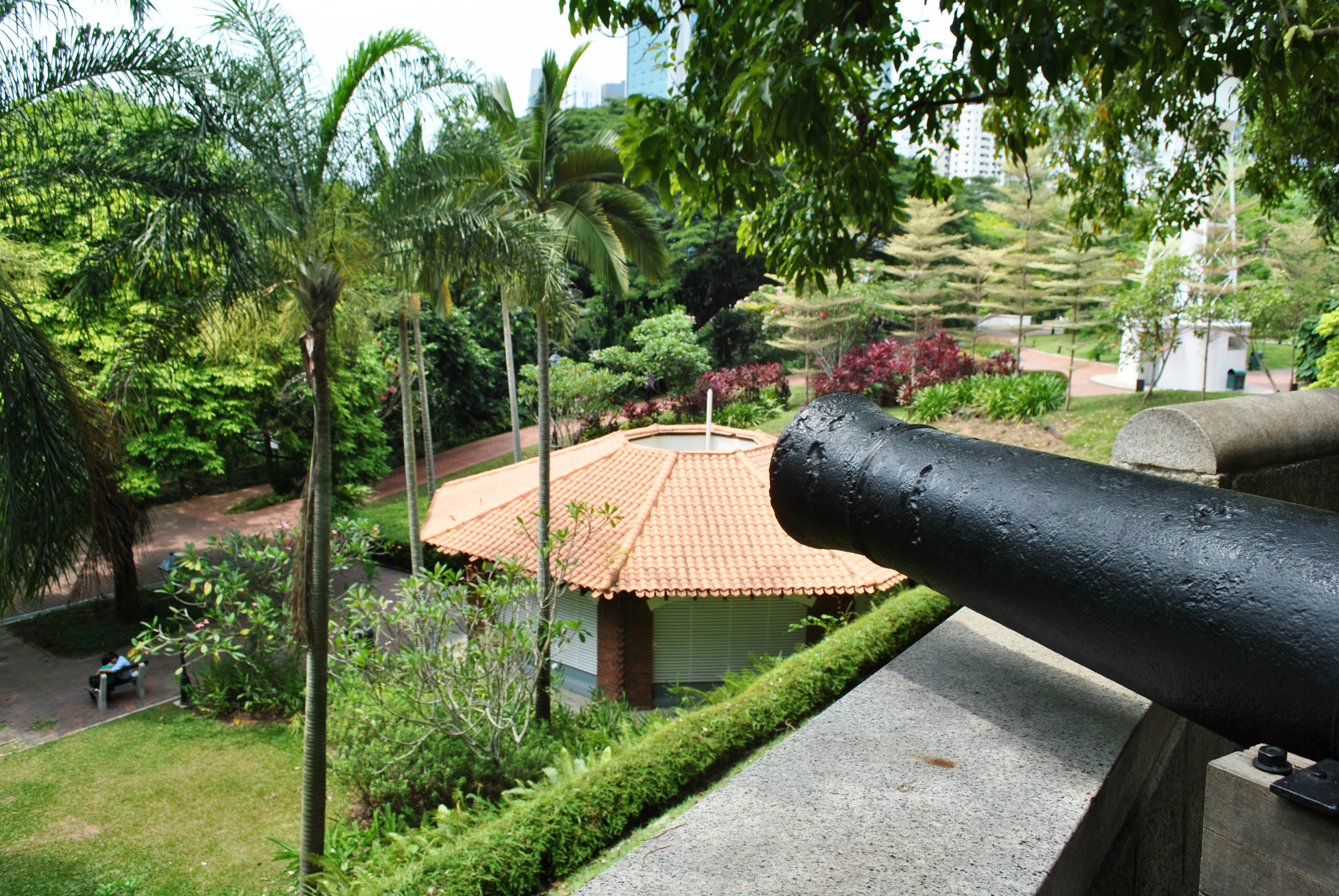
9-Pound Cannon

In 1907, the old fort was demolished, and only the gateway of the fort and two nine-pound cannons remain. A military headquarters known as Headquarters Malaya Command Operations Bunker was then built with underground rooms serving as operations centre. Under the British Army, it served as the headquarters of the Singapore Base District until the spread of World War II into the Asia Pacific in 1941. Completed in 1938, this ‘bunker’ comprised 30 rooms and had its own generator. On 15 February 1942 Lieutenant-General Arthur Ernest Percival surrendered Singapore to the Japanese here. The Japanese also used the buildings above and below the ground for its military until the end of the occupation in 1945, when the British army resumed control. The underground bunker however was abandoned, but it was re-opened on 31 January 1992 as a tourist attraction and is now known as The Battle Box.

As the island moved towards self-determination, the British handed over control of the fort to the Singaporean military in 1963, and was home to the headquarters of the 4th Malaysian Infantry Brigade until December 1966 when it was in turn handed over to the Singapore Armed Forces. The SAF proceeded to build the Singapore Command and Staff College on the fort, which officially opened on 13 February 1970.

=== Fort Canning Reservoir ===
Construction of the Fort Canning Service Reservoir started in 1927 and finished in 1929. It was built on top the hill on the site of a former barrack and parade ground of the demolished fort. Excavation for the reservoir in 1928 found a cache of Javanese-style gold jewellery dating to the mid-14th century. The reservoir is covered and access is restricted.

=== Van Kleef Aquarium ===
The Van Kleef Aquarium was first constructed in 1955 at the foot of Fort Canning Hill known as King George V Jubilee Park facing River Valley Road. The aquarium was the first of its kind in South-East Asia, and attracted over 150,000 visitors within three months of its opening, and had around 400,000 visitors annually by the 1970s. However, due to competition from newer attractions which led to declining visitors in the 1980s, it closed on 31 May 1991. A number of attempts were made to renew operation at the site but all were unsuccessful. It finally closed in 1996, and the building demolished in 1998.

=== National Theatre ===
Known as the People's Theatre, the National Theatre was later built near the Van Kleef Aquarium on the western slope of the hill and closer to the Clemenceau Avenue road. The theatre was officially opened on 8 August 1963 and was once the venue for various international performances, universities' convocations and the National Day rallies, it was demolished in August 1986 to make way for the nearby construction part of Central Expressway along Clemenceau Avenue.

== Fort Canning Park ==
Fort Canning Park
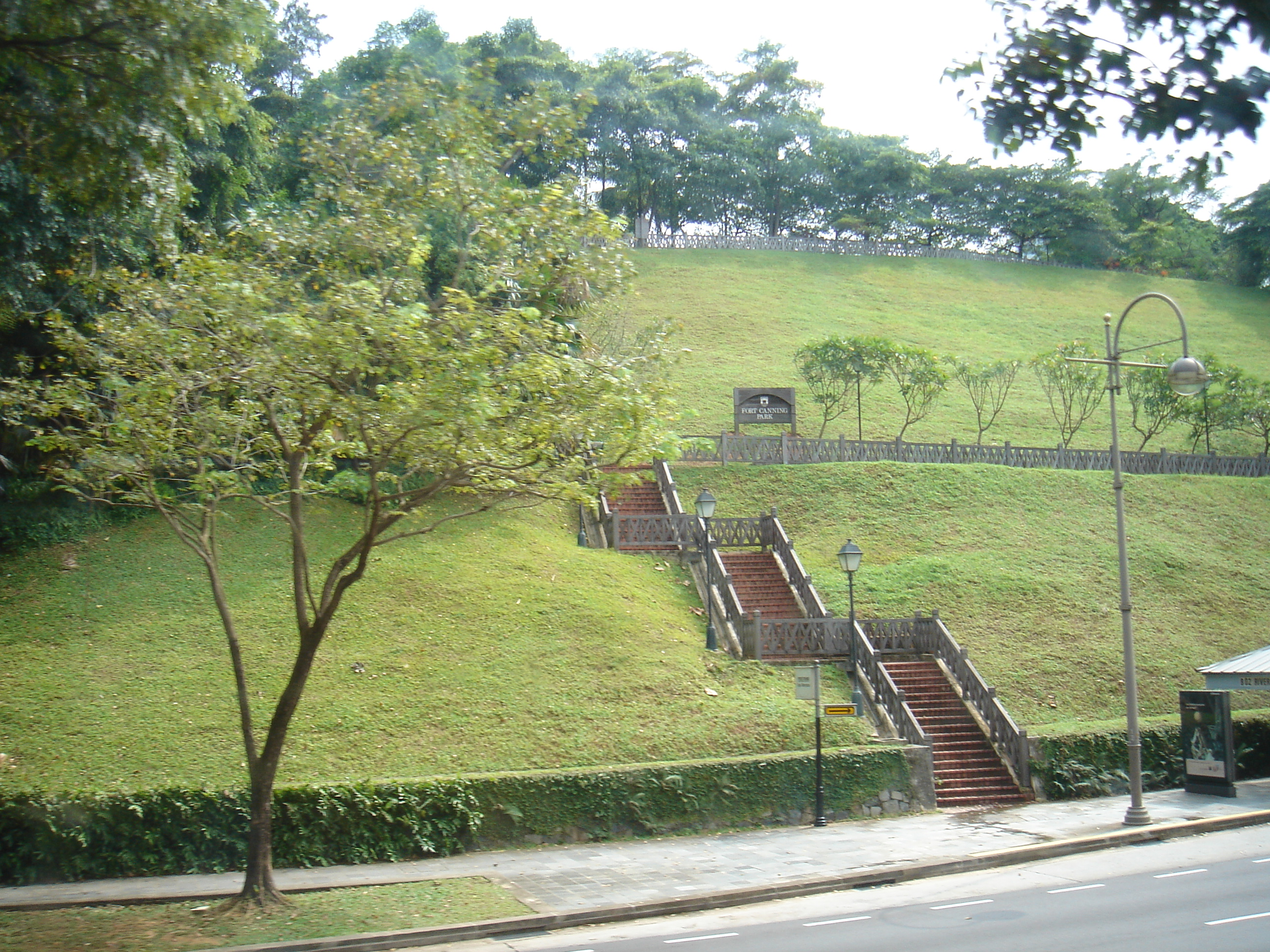
- Fort Canning Park
- Interactive map of Fort Canning Park
- Type: Historic park
- Location: Fort Canning Hill, Singapore
- Area: 18 hectares (180,000 m^{2})
- Opened: 1 November 1981; 45 years ago
- Manager: National Parks Board
- Operator: National Parks Board
- Status: Open
- Public transit: DT20 Fort Canning; DT21 Bencoolen; NE5 Clarke Quay; NS24 NE6 CC1 Dhoby Ghaut

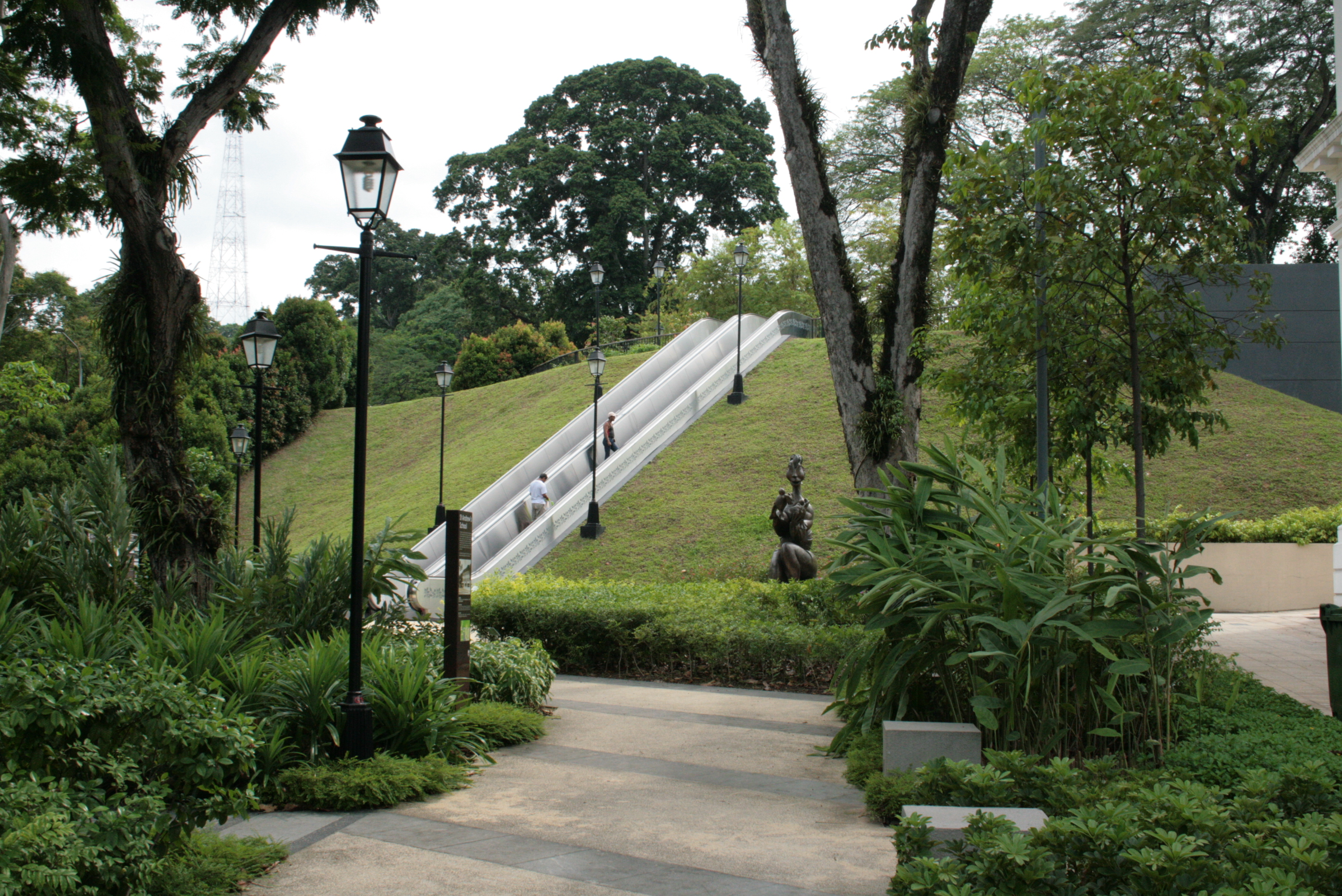
Escalator at Fort Canning Park

The area became known as Central Park in 1972 when the land previously used by the British armed forces was combined with King George V Jubilee Park. The park was then renamed Fort Canning Park on 1 November 1981 by Lee Kuan Yew, and converted into a historical park.

The park overlooks Orchard Road and is set in the heart of the Civic and Cultural District of Singapore, and it now offers a variety of recreational activities as well as historical, educational, entertainment and cultural experiences, and is also used as a place for social events. The park also serves as an important "green lung" for Singapore's Museum area and the adjacent downtown city area. The unique blend of historical relics, lush greenery and expansive lawns has made Fort Canning a hub of cultural and artistic activity. It has been a venue of choice for staging myriad outdoor events and activities like theatre carnivals such as Shakespeare in the Park by SRT, art festivals, starlight cinemas and Ballet Under the Stars performances. WOMAD, Singapore's largest music festival, was a regular feature of the park's calendar of events from 1998 to 2007. The Fort Canning Tunnel passes directly under the hill.

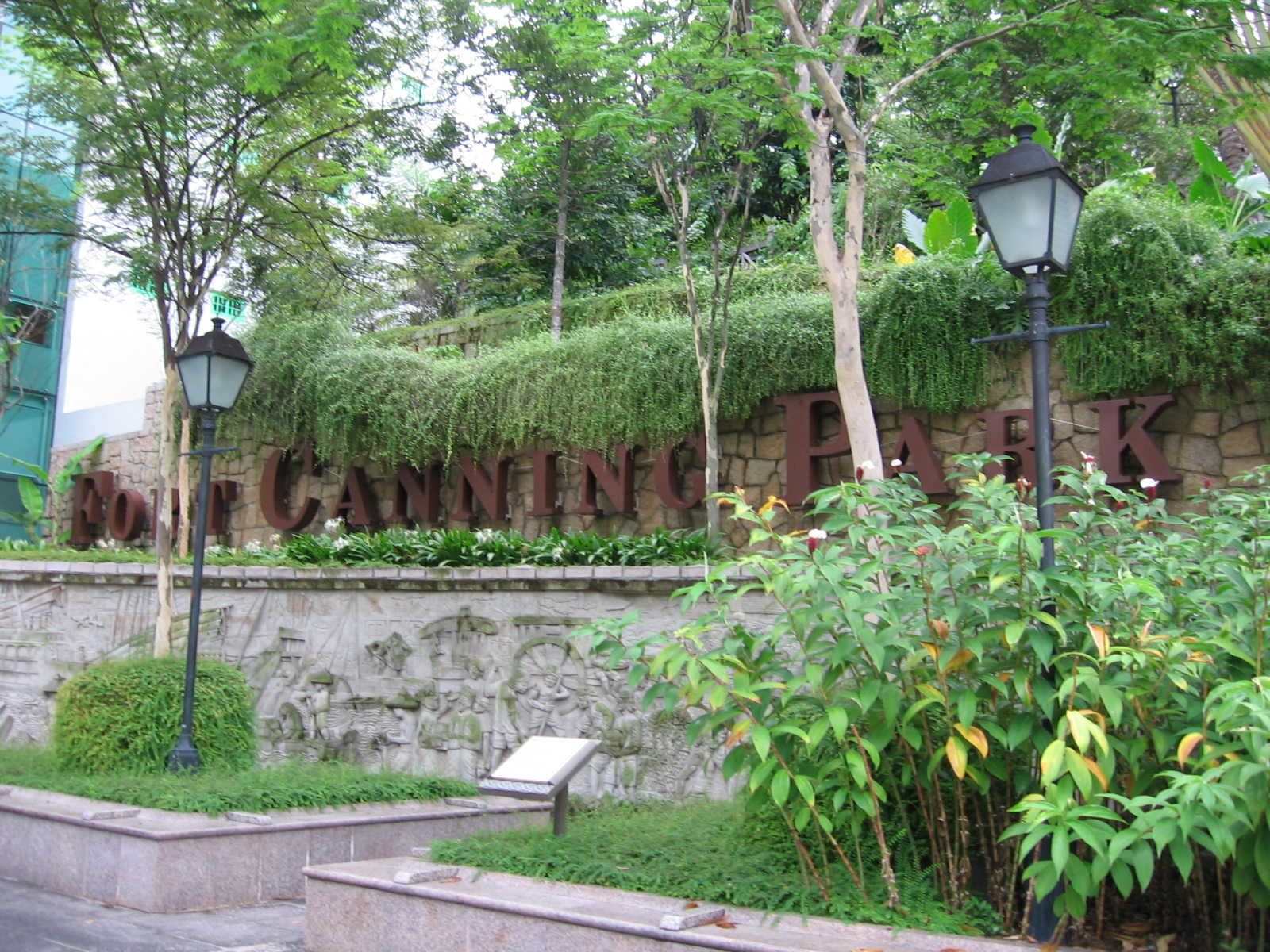
The entrance of Fort Canning Park on Hill Street

Fort Canning Park has been designated as the venue of the bicentennial showcase in 2019, an event which commemorates 200 years since the founding of Singapore. To restore the heritage of the area, three historical gardens will be recreated. They are the Royal Garden, the First Botanical Garden and Jubilee Park. Other enhancements to the park include a new heritage museum at the Fort Canning Centre, a reproduction of an ancient spring and improvements in accessibility.

Jubilee Park will be the most "kids friendly" park with a nature-themed playground and slides that follows the contours of the hill. Jubilee Park opened in Jun 2019.

=== Attractions ===
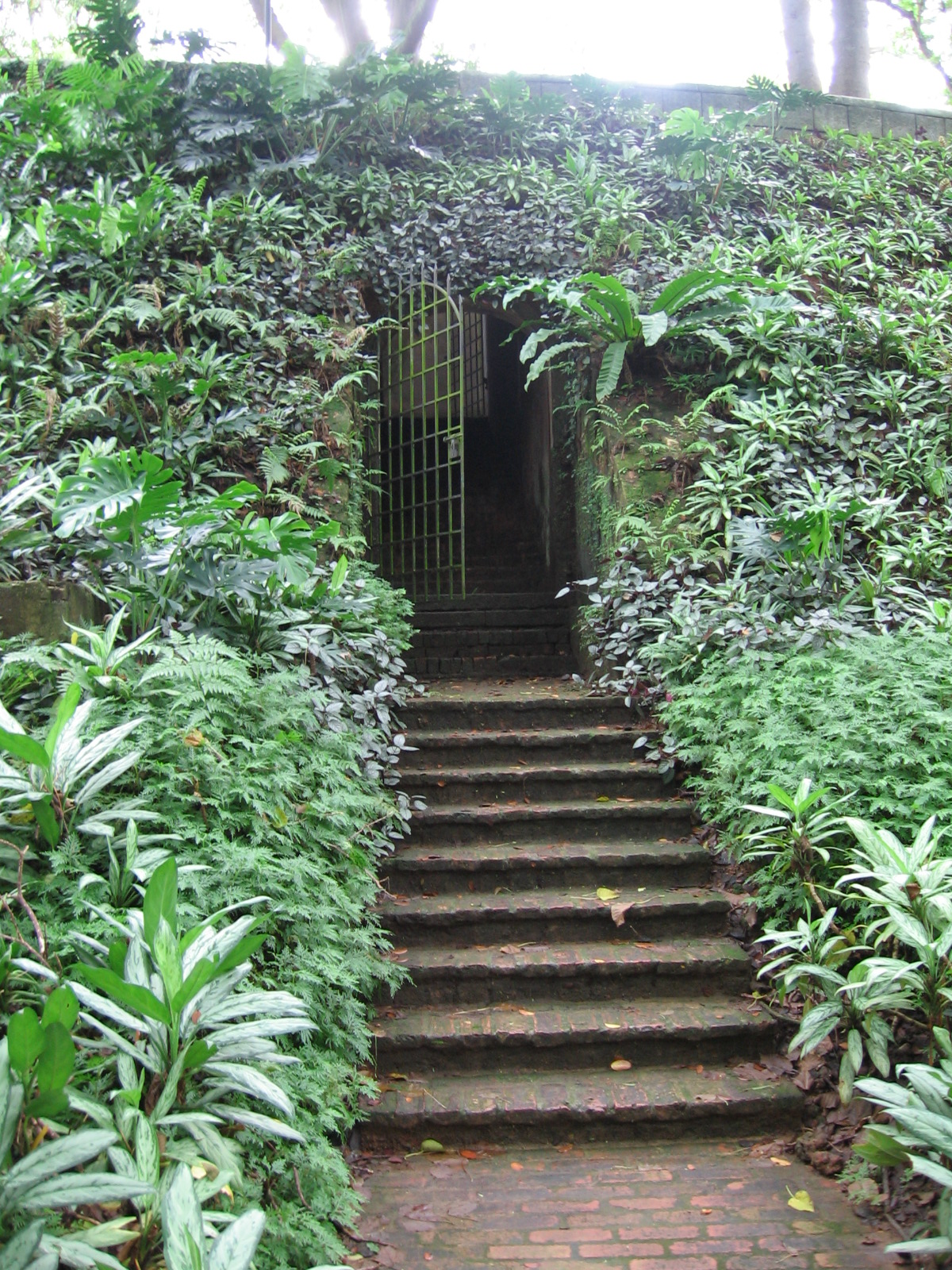
A sally port on Fort Canning Hill

Some points of interest that may be found in the park:

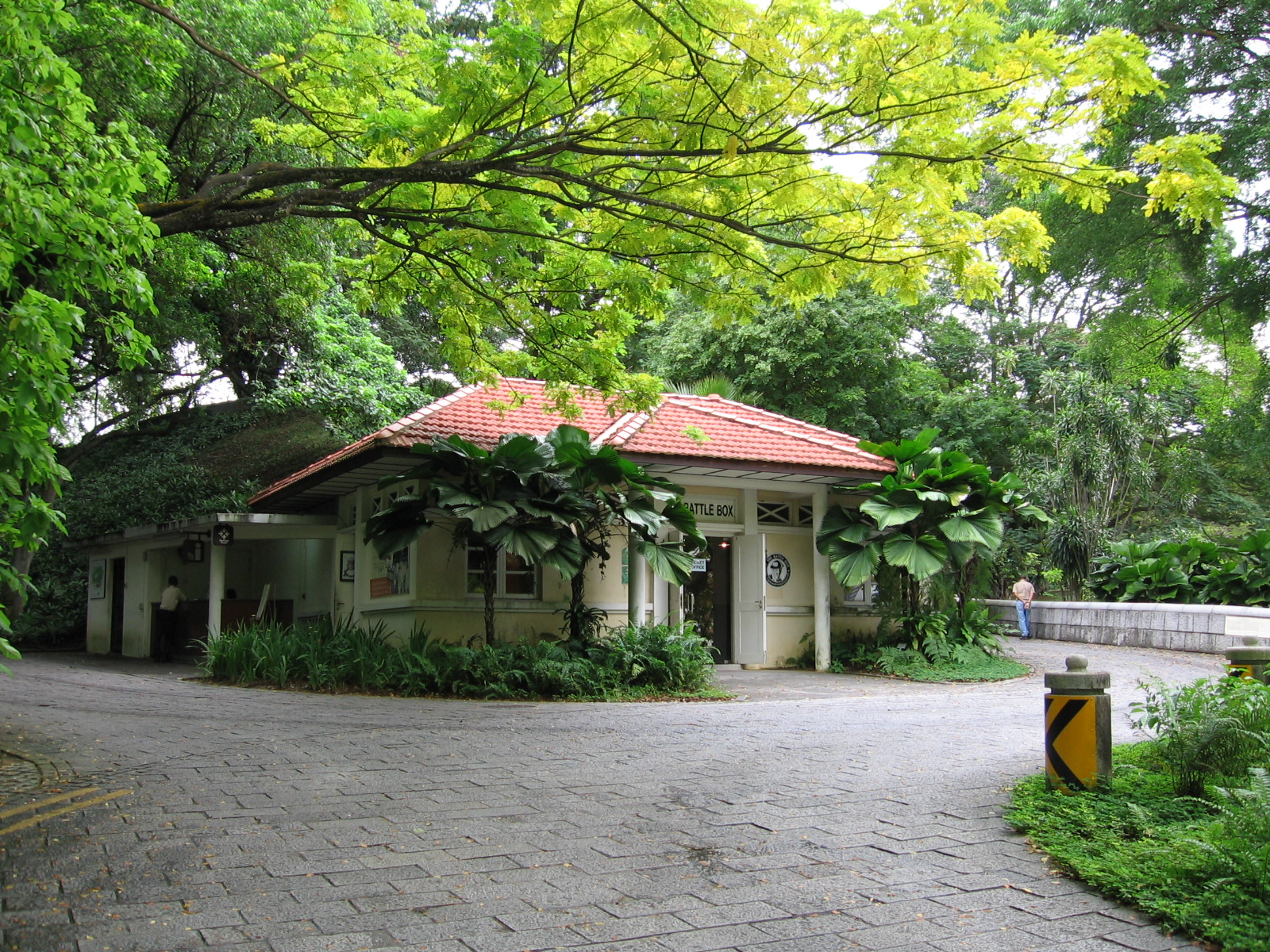
The Battle Box, Underground Far East Command Centre

- Underground Far East Command Centre (The Battle Box): During the Second World War, Lieutenant General Arthur Ernest Percival (Commander of British Forces) used the underground bunkers at Fort Canning as his commanding base.
- Sally Port: The sally port is a small hidden door that leads into or out of a fort, allowing occupants to escape from the fort undetected. Fort Canning had at least three sally ports but only one remains today.
- Fort Wall and Gate: Raffles, in a letter to William Farquhar in 1819, on the suitability of building a fortress on Government Hill: " ...On the hill overlooking the Settlement, and commanding it and a considerable portion of the anchorage, a small Fort, capable of mounting 8 or 10 pounders and of containing a magazine of brick or stone, together with a barrack for the permanent residence of 30 European artillery, and of temporary accommodation of the rest of the garrison in case of emergency." The fort was built in 1859 but it has since been demolished. Only the gateway designed by G. C. Collyer and two cannons remain.
- 9-Pound Cannon: One of a pair of cannons that was meant to shoot 9-pound balls. Playing a decorative role rather than a defensive one, the cannon was fired three times a day at 5 a.m., 1 p.m., and 9 p.m. to announce the hour. It was also fired as a salute and warning of town fires. Next to the cannon is South Battery, the site at which the main battery of guns was mounted to defend Singapore in the 19th century.
- Spice Garden: The garden is a replica of the first experimental botanical garden in Singapore established by Sir Stamford Raffles. Raffles had noble ambitions for Singapore's agricultural development, and had sent from Bencoolen spices like clove plants and nutmeg seeds to be planted in the garden.
- Gothic Gates: These imposing and sombre gateways in gothic style lead the visitor into Fort Canning Green, where a Christian cemetery used to stand. Built in 1846, these gates have since become a landmark of Fort Canning Hill. The letters above both gates, "IHS" are iota, eta and sigma, the first three letters of the Greek word for Jesus.

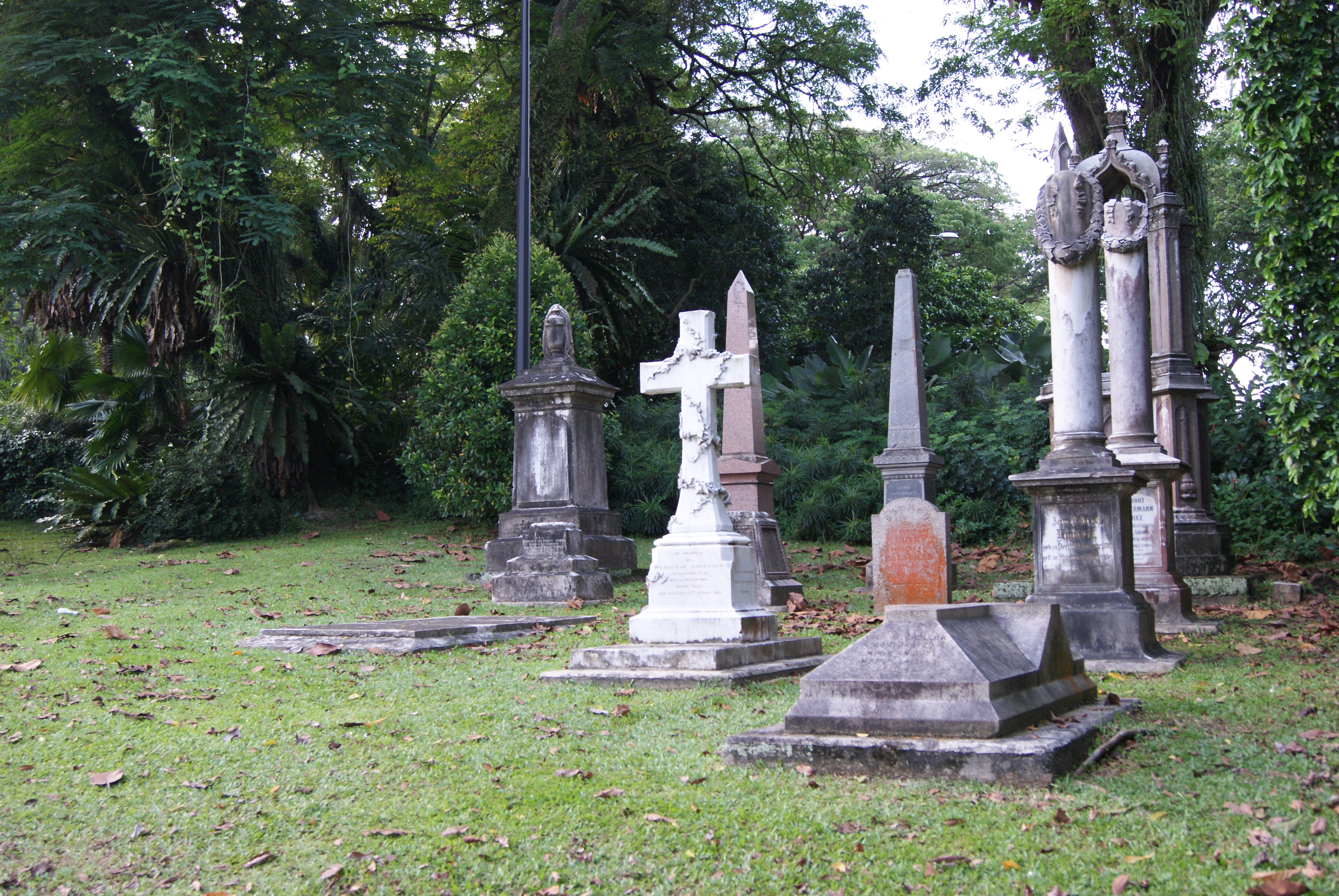
Gravestones in Fort Canning Green, relocated from Bukit Timah Cemetery

- Fort Canning Green: A former graveyard for Christian graves.
- Cupolas: The cupolas, designed by George Drumgoole Coleman, were probably places of rest. George Coleman was a talented architect who left his mark on the urban landscape of Singapore. He was Raffles' consultant on Singapore's first town plan. As Superintendent of Public Works, he oversaw projects of land reclamation and construction of roads and landmarks such as the Armenian Church.
- James Brooke Napier Memorial: Dedicated to James Brooke Napier, the infant son of William Napier, who was Singapore's first Law Agent, and Maria Frances Napier, the widow of George Coleman. The memorial was the largest erected in the cemetery, reflecting the status of William Napier.

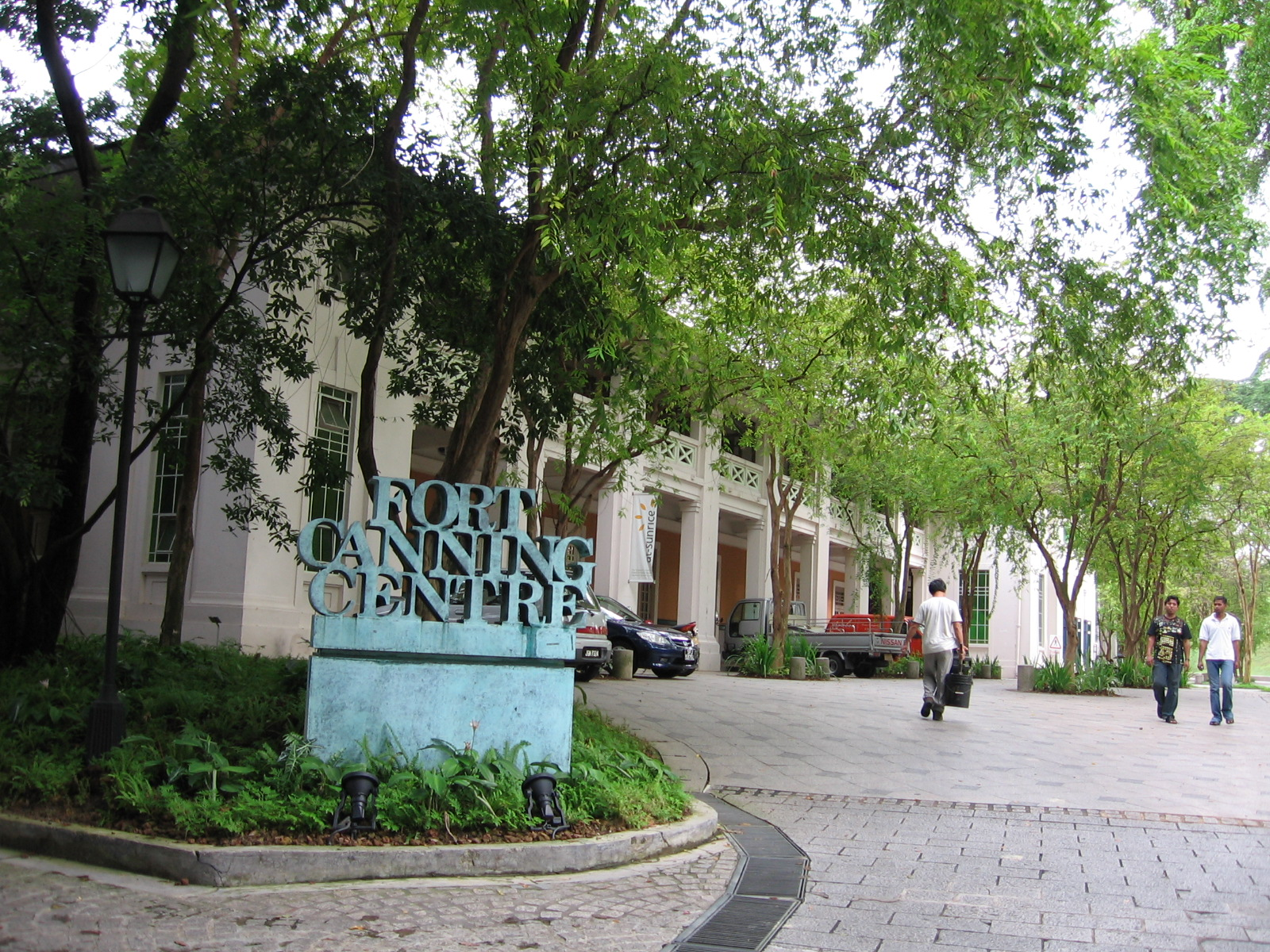
Fort Canning Centre

- Fort Canning Centre: Fort Canning Arts Centre used to be the barracks of the British Army. The British Army chose Fort Canning as its headquarters of its defence bases in the 1920s to protect British interests in Southeast Asia.
- Raffles House: Sir Stamford Raffles built his house on Government Hill on his third and last visit to Singapore. The original house of Raffles was actually a wood and atap bungalow 100 ft long and 50 ft wide, and not the present brick and tile structure. Raffles wrote in a letter to William Marsden in 1823: "We have lately built a small bungalow on Singapore Hill where, though the height is inconsiderable, we find a great difference in climate. Nothing can be more interesting and beautiful than the view from this spot. The tombs of the Malay Kings are close at hand, and I have settled that if it is my fate to die here I shall take my place amongst them: this will at any rate be better than leaving my bones at Bencoolen..."

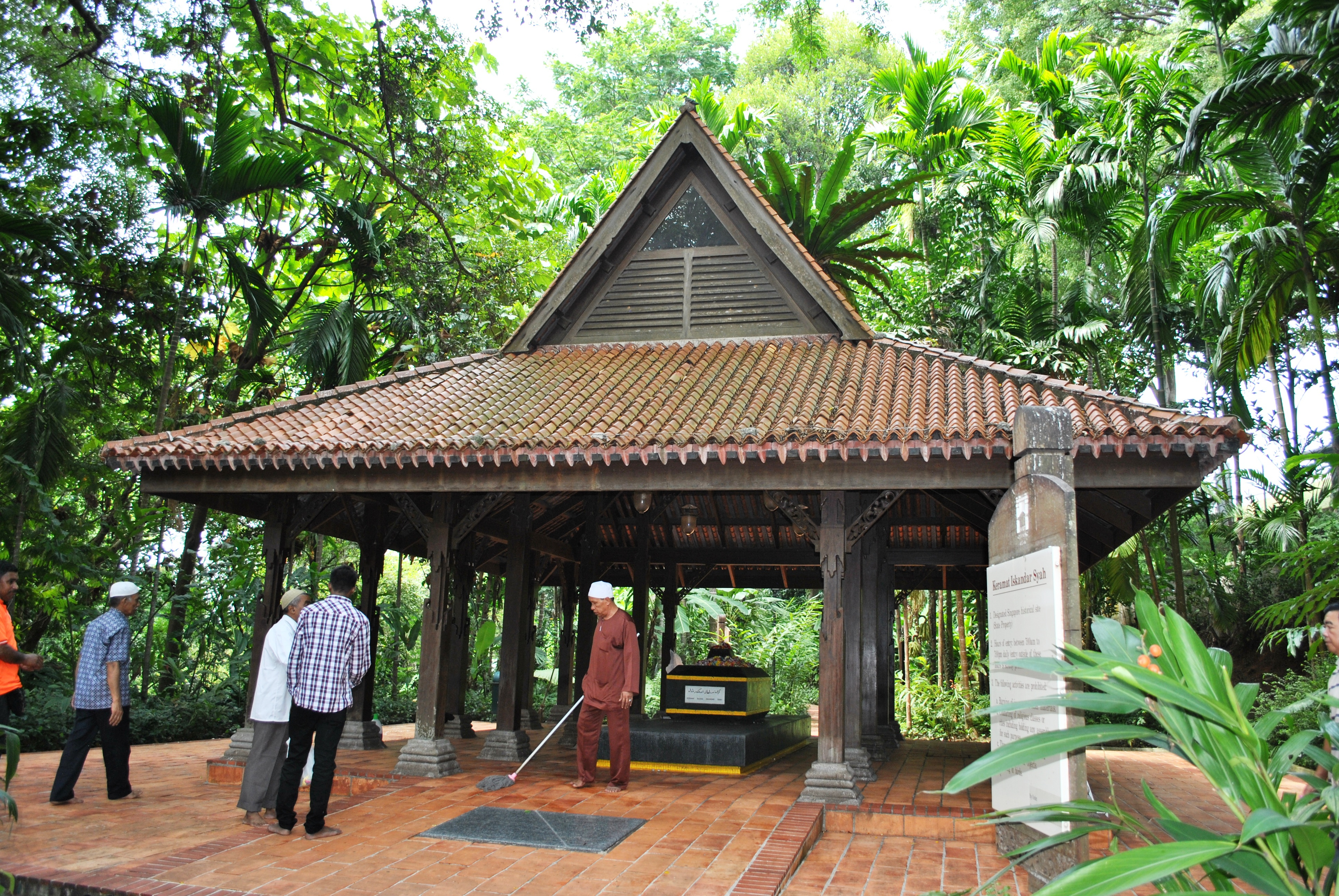
Keramat Iskandar Shah

- Keramat Iskandar Shah: Keramat Iskandar Shah is a sacred place dedicated to Iskandar Shah (believe to be the same person as Parameswara), the last ruler of 14th century Singapore before he fled to Melaka to escape an attack from the Siamese. Although named after him, scholars thought that the keramat could not be Iskandar Shah's tomb as he had died in Melaka and was buried to the north of Melaka. No evidence of burial has been found at this keramat site and it is unclear how it became associated with Iskandar Shah.
- Archaeological Excavation Site: In 1984, archaeologist John Miksic and his team began an archaeological excavation that continues until today. Among the artefacts recovered were porcelain, earthenware and glass shards. These artefacts show that there could have been a palace of a Malay kingdom on Fort Canning Hill, with possibility of glass and gold workshops.
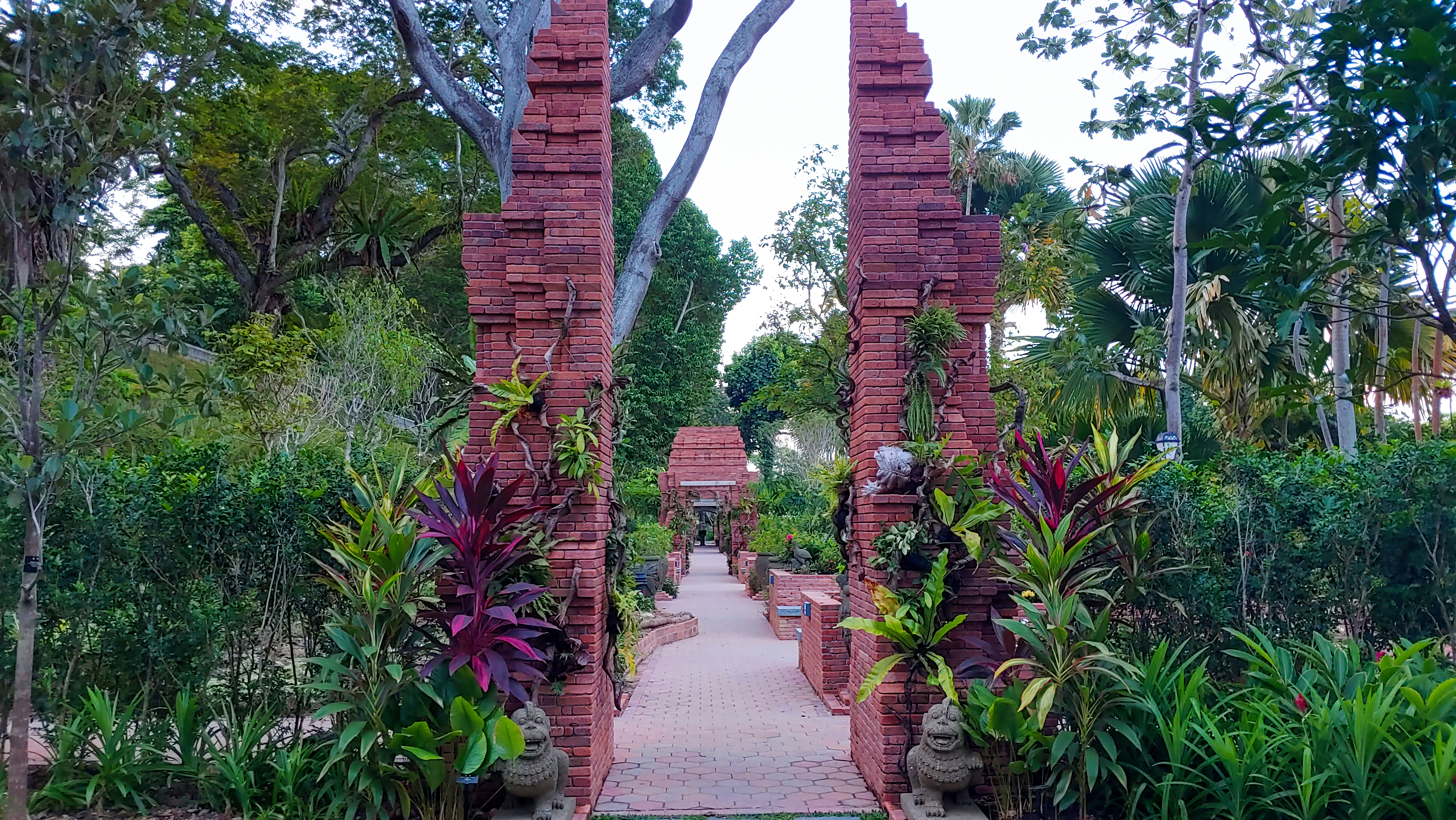
- Sang Nila Utama Garden.
  Sang Nila Utama Garden: One of nine historical gardens opened in 2019, and named after the Palembang prince that founded early Singapore. The architecture is based on famous Southeast Asian gardens. A series of Javanese split gates and a reflected pool are among some of the Sang Nila Utama Garden's features and architecture.
- Fort Canning Lighthouse: Fort Canning Lighthouse, originally built in 1903, was one of the 13 important lighthouses guiding ships crossing the Strait of Malacca. It was decommissioned in 1958 due to the increasing number of high-rises in Singapore blocking its visibility from the sea. A replica was erected later on Fort Canning Hill to commemorate its role in Singapore's maritime history.
- Mett Singapore: The luxury hotel opens on 28 October in the former Hotel Fort Canning building within Fort Canning Park. The hotel is owned by Dubai-based Sunset Hospitality Group.

== See also ==
- Fort Canning Reservoir
- List of parks in Singapore
- Fort Canning MRT station
