= Battlebox =

Museum in Singapore

Headquarters Malaya Command Operations Bunker 地下指挥中心博物馆
- Fort Canning Hill in Singapore
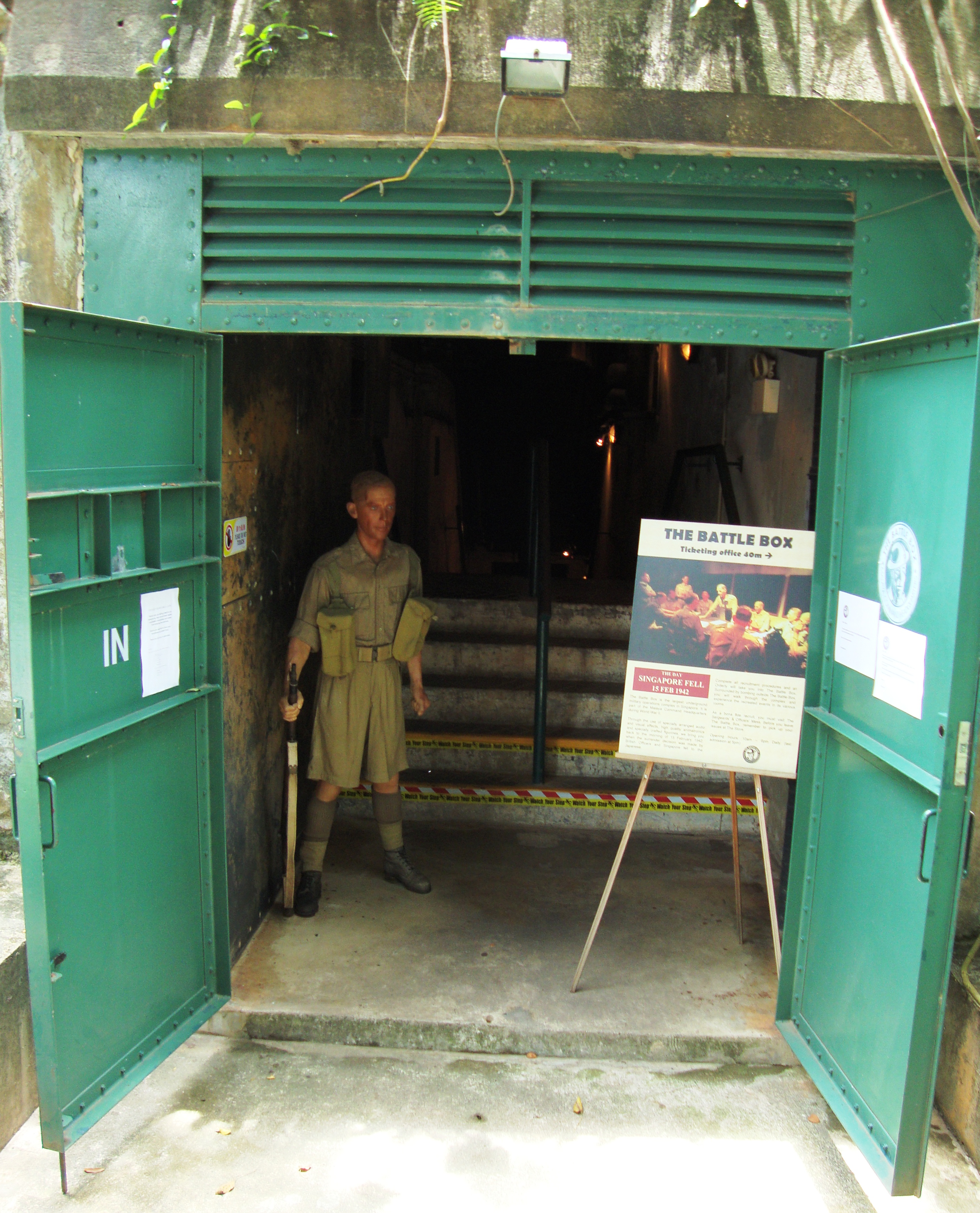
- One of the entrances to the Battle Box museum

Site information
- Type: bunker
- Owner: British Army (former)
- Open to the public: yes
- Condition: Renovated
- Website: www.battlebox.sg

Location
- Location in Singapore
- Coordinates: 1°17′46.0″N 103°50′46.3″E

Site history
- Built: 1936
- In use: 1945
- Fate: Renovated into a museum
- Battles/wars: Malayan Campaign; Battle of Singapore

Garrison information
- Past commanders: Lieutenant-General Arthur Percival

Battlebox (formerly The Battle Box) is the popular name of the Fort Canning Bunker, formerly known as Headquarters Malaya Command Operations Bunker, constructed under Fort Canning Hill, Singapore, as an emergency, bomb-proof command centre during the Malayan Campaign and the Battle of Singapore. The Battle Box is currently a museum and tourist attraction.

== History ==
Given its position in the western Pacific ocean, Singapore had long been recognised as being strategically important for the Royal Navy to counter the growing influence of the Japanese, who were regarded as being the logical threat to Britain's interests in the Far East and the Pacific. To counter this, the Admiralty devised the Singapore strategy, which required a well equipped naval base. Accordingly, the Singapore Naval Base was constructed on the north shore of Singapore Island. The base, and its associated defences, required a large British military presence on the island.

Fort Canning Hill was used by the British Army as their headquarters in Singapore, with a number of buildings built for this purpose in the 1920s. However, the lack of a headquarters combining all three services present in Singapore – the Army, Royal Navy and Royal Air Force – was appreciated in 1936 by the then Colonel Arthur Percival, the Chief of Staff to General Dobbie, 'General Officer Commanding, Malaya'. To remedy this, a Combined Operations Headquarters was proposed for Fort Canning.

=== Construction ===
Fort Canning Hill is a small hill in the Central Area of Singapore Island. Stamford Raffles had built a residence there in 1823, but when the Straits Settlement, which included Singapore, became a crown colony in 1867, a fort was constructed on the hill. However, by the turn of the century, the construction of other defences around Singapore rendered the Fort Canning fortifications surplus to requirements.

Located nearly 30 feet beneath the hill, the Fort Canning Bunker, also known as the Headquarters Malaya Command Operations Bunker, was constructed in 1936 and completed by 1941. Sources vary as to the number of rooms in the bunker; one states 22, while another, authored by the journalist who rediscovered the Battle Box, claims 29 rooms. The bunker was constructed with one metre thick (3 feet) reinforced concrete walls to withstand direct hits from bombs and shells. The complex included a telephone exchange connected to all military and most civilian switchboards in Malaya, various signals and operations rooms, sleeping quarters and latrines. The bunker also included a cipher room for coding and decoding messages, but by the time of the fall of Malaya, this work had been shifted elsewhere and the cipher room was used as sleeping quarters. The Commander of Fixed Defences, Brigadier Curtis, co-ordinated the coastal artillery strikes on naval targets from the bunker.

=== World War Two ===
By 1941, the bunker was considered to be too small for its intended use. Percival, having returned to Malaya as a lieutenant general and 'General Officer Commanding, Malaya', authorised construction of a new Combined Operations Headquarters at the Royal Air Force (RAF) headquarters in Sime Road. The construction of this new headquarters began in 1941, and was finished in December of that year. Although Combined Operations Headquarters had been relocated to Sime Road, the Fort Canning Bunker remained the Headquarters of Major General Frank Keith Simmons, who as the 'Fortress Commander, Singapore', was responsible for the defence of Singapore Island. The Anti-Aircraft Gun Operations Room and Naval Extended Defences offices also remained at the bunker.

The Japanese invaded Malaya on 8 December 1941 by moving south through Thailand, as well as by making landings at Kota Baharu, on the north east coast of Malaya. Rapidly retreating through Malaya, Allied forces were forced back to Singapore Island by 31 January 1942. On 8 February, Japanese troops then crossed the Straits of Johor at the Battle of Sarimbun Beach on the north-west coast of Singapore Island, followed by a second landing near the Kranji River, at the Battle of Kranji.

The Sime Road location had to be abandoned during the Battle of Kranji, with Lieutenant-General Percival shifting the Combined Operations Headquarters to Fort Canning Bunker on 11 February 1942. By the latter stages of the battle for Singapore, the Japanese were bombing the Central Area of Singapore, including Fort Canning Hill, at will. Fort Canning Hill was also within range of the Japanese artillery, forcing personnel into the bunker. There were around 500 officers and men in the bunker in the latter stages of the battle.

The decision to surrender Singapore was made by Lieutenant-General Percival in a meeting on the morning of 15 February 1942. Held in the 'Commander, Anti-Aircraft Defence Room' of the bunker, a number of senior officers were in attendance, including Generals Bennett, Heath and Simmons. With diminishing water supplies, and no viable options for launching a counterattack, the decision was made to seek terms with the Japanese.

The Fort Canning Bunker was later occupied by Japanese forces during the Japanese Occupation of Singapore and used for communications right up to the time of the Japanese surrender. At the conclusion of the Second World War, the bunker complex itself appears to have been looted in the aftermath of the Japanese surrender. Upon re-entry to the complex in 1988, evidence of a number of excavations were observed, presumably attempts to find loot that may have been concealed by the Japanese.

== Present day ==
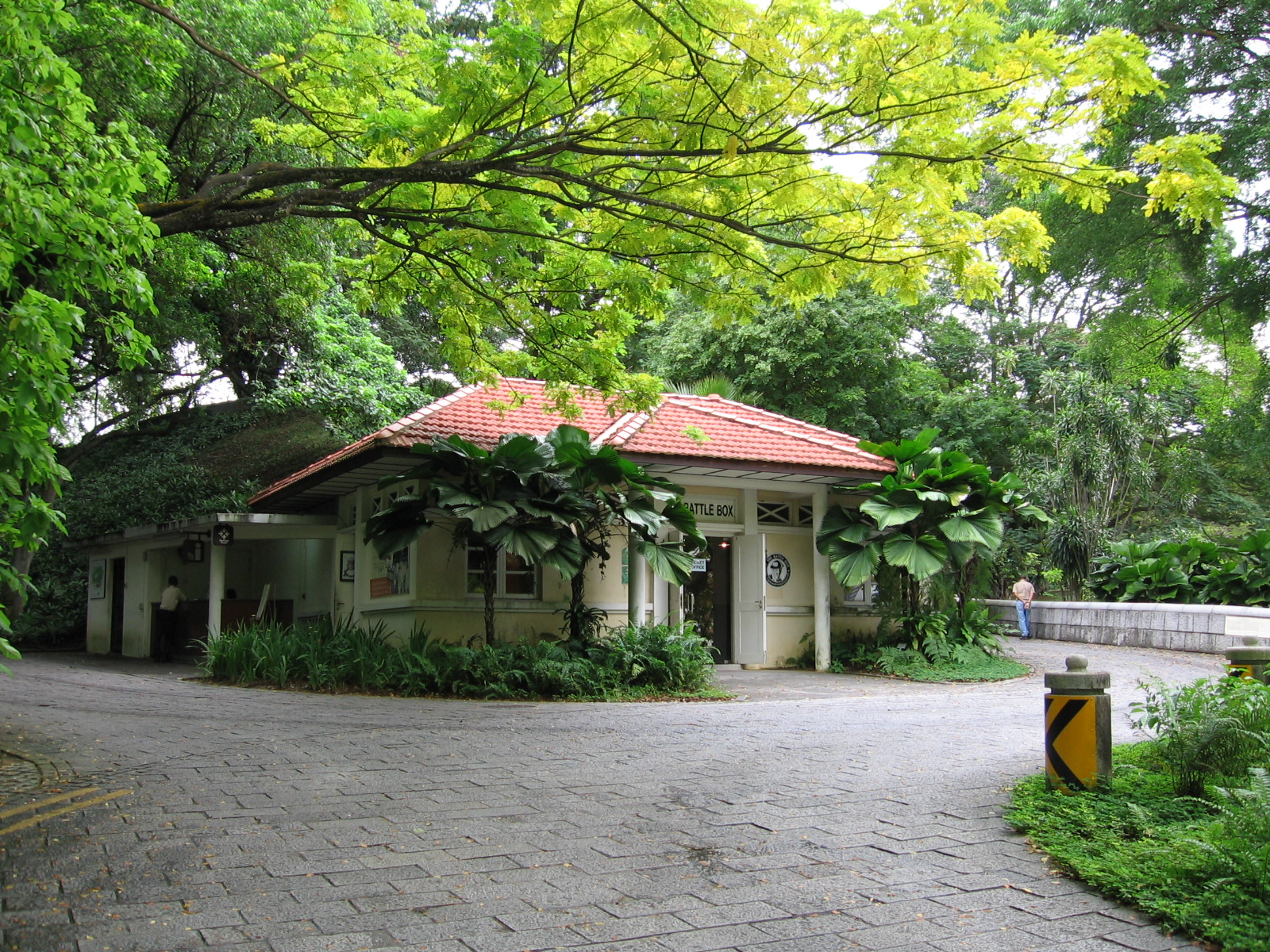
The Battle Box ticketing office, Fort Canning Hill

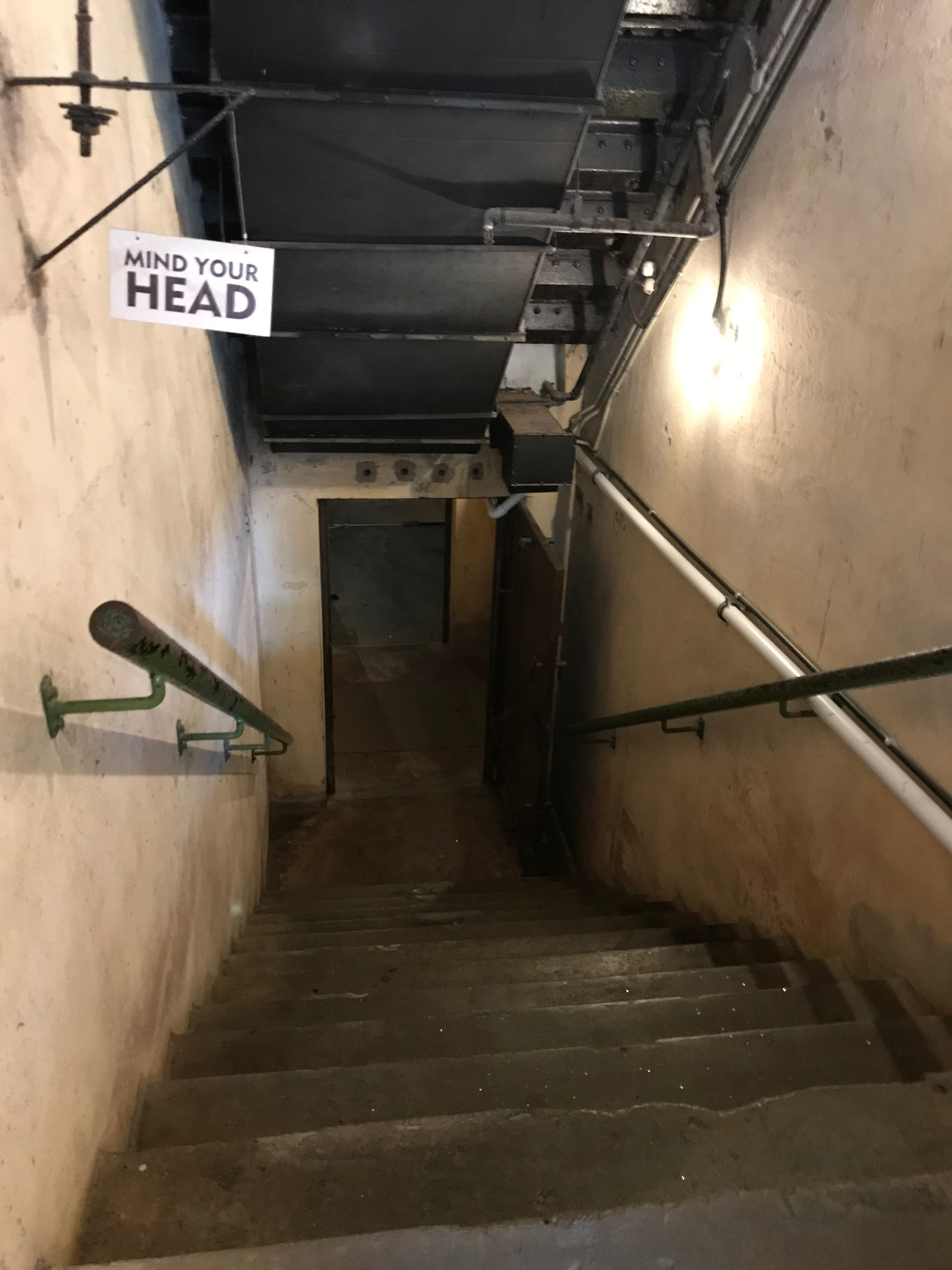
Stairs at an entrance leading down to the underground level

After the war, the British again used Fort Canning Hill as the Singapore Base District Headquarters. The British handed over Fort Canning to the Singapore Armed Forces in 1968–69, and the buildings of Fort Canning Hill served for a time as the Singapore Command and Staff College. The Fort Canning Bunker, having remained empty and unused since the war, was sealed off in the late 1960s due to safety concerns and its exact location forgotten.It reentered public awareness in 1988 when a journalist, following leads about an underground bunker complex, rediscovered it.

The Fort Canning Bunker was developed into a museum depicting the final days of the Battle of Singapore. The museum, called the Battle Box, was formally opened on 15 February 1997, on the 55th anniversary of the surrender of Singapore.

The Battlebox reopened to the public on 15 February 2024, operated by non-profit arts and culture organisation Global Cultural Alliance, who were awarded a contract by the National Parks Board on 20 February 2023 after an open tender. Admission to the Battlebox is currently free for all visitors. While admission is free, visitors will be charged if they wish to enjoy some of the enhancements such as an audio tour. To ensure the historical accuracy of its experiences, Global Cultural Alliance has put together an advisory team led by independent curator Tan Teng Teng, who was involved in establishing The Battlebox as a museum when it first opened to the public in 1997.

== See also ==
- Battle of Singapore
- Fort Canning
- Singapore strategy
