= Thomas Oxley (British surgeon) =

Thomas Oxley (1805–1886) was Surgeon of the Straits Settlements. However, he is best remembered now as a plantation owner. Oxley Road, on which Lee Kuan Yew's house is sited, is named after him.

== Early life ==
Oxley was born in May 1805 in Dublin.

He was the eldest son of Thomas Oxley Merchant of Wakefield, later Dublin Large Estate owner at Killiney until insolvency in 1830’s, and his wife Isabella Duffin, the daughter of Charles Duffin, Inspector General at the Irish Linen Board from 1791 until his resignation in 1810 due to alleged financial mishandlings.

Oxley was first posted to Penang in 1825. In 1830, he became Assistant Surgeon to the Residency, and was posted to Singapore that year. In 1838, he was transferred to Malacca, where he was also Police Magistrate, Superintendent of Police, Collector of Assessment and Commissioner of the Court of Requests. On 12 October 1841, he returned to Singapore. He was appointed Sheriff for the three settlements in 1842, Senior Surgeon in 1844, and Surgeon of the Straits Settlements in 1847. Oxley left Singapore for England in 1857. He died in 1886.

Oxley wrote a number of scientific papers, and was an early researcher on the uses of gutta percha.

== Oxley's Estate (also known as Killiney Estate) ==
In 1837, Oxley acquired 173 acres of jungle land, bounded by Orchard Road, Grange Road, Leonie Hill Road, River Valley Road and Tank Road, from the East India Company. Other records suggest that he acquired the land in 1845. He named his estate Killiney Estate and developed it into a nutmeg plantation. A nutmeg blight decimated nutmeg crops in the region in 1855-56. Oxley began to sell off the land in his plantation in parcels, before leaving for England in 1857.

He died at Southampton on 6th March 1886, and was buried in Southampton Old Cemetery.

Several roads in what was his plantation are named after him, including Oxley Road, Oxley Walk, Oxley Garden and Oxley Rise.

== Singapore Museum (Raffles Museum) ==
Oxley was a member of the committee formed to formulate rules for the Singapore Museum in 1849. He was later elected chairman of the Museum Committee in 1851.

== Raffles Institution ==
In 1835, Oxley was elected Honorary Secretary of the Committee for Raffles Institution.
